= Clara Lida =

Argentine historian

Clara Eugenia Lida
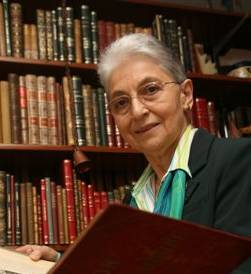
- Born: Buenos Aires, Argentina
- Other names: Clara Lida, Clara E. Lida
- Education: Princeton University
- Occupations: history professor, researcher
- Scientific career
- Fields: History of social movements, Anarchism and socialisms in the 19th century; Spanish emigration and political exile
- Workplaces: El Colegio de México (Colmex)
- Website: Clara Lida

Clara Eugenia Lida (Buenos Aires, December 27, 1941) is an Argentinian historian, well known for her work on social movements, anarchism and socialisms in the 19th century, and on Spanish emigration and Republican exile.

== First years ==
Daughter of philologist Raimundo Lida (1908–1979), she studied with Silvio Zavala, in Mexico, and Vicente Llorens, at Princeton University. Her formal education as a historian started at Brandeis University (Waltham, Massachusetts), where she obtained her BA in 1963. She continued her higher education at El Colegio de México (MA, 1964) and Princeton University (1965–1969), where she obtained her PhD in history and literature. She taught at Wesleyan University, Connecticut (1968–1974), and at the State University of New York at Stony Brook (1974–1987).

== Activities ==
In 1969 she was the co-founder of the “Society [now Association] for Spanish and Portuguese Historical Studies”, which she presided from 1969 to 1972.

She was visiting professor of history at El Colegio de México in 1979. Since 1982 she is research-professor at the Centro de Estudios Históricos, El Colegio de México, where she holds the chair on Mexico-Spain and co-directs two permanent seminars, one on Mexico-Spain and the other on Social History. She has been visiting professor at the University of California, Los Angeles, the Menéndez Pelayo International University (Spain), the Universidad Nacional Autónoma de México (UNAM), where she held the Chair “Teachers in Exile”, and at the École des Hautes Études en Sciences Sociales (Paris), among other higher education institutions. She has also taught and lectured in Latin America, Spain, Europe and Japan.

== Research projects ==
Her major research interests are related to Spain, often in a comparative perspective with Mexico, Latin America and the rest of Europe. Her published works are considered major references for scholars interested in the history of 19th-century social movements and comparative studies on both sides of the Atlantic. Her pioneering work in the field of migrations and exiles from Spain to Mexico and South America consist of cultural, institutional, social and quantitative approaches. Her work on revolutionary movements in Europe and the Hispanic world, particularly on anarchism, are also renowned and a reference in the field. Other aspects of her professional work include studies on the Spanish novel and on cultural aspects of anarchist literature. A less known fact is that she has also published poetry.

She is a member of the Mexican Academy of Sciences and Emerita Researcher at the National Research System (Sistema Nacional de Investigadores, Conahcyt, Mexico). Also, she is an Honorary Member of the Mexican Academy of History and of the National Academy of History in Argentina.

== Awards and honors ==
She has received several grants from varied institutions around the globe:

- The Rockefeller Foundation
- The Social Science Research Council
- The American Council of Learned Societies
- UNESCO
- The German Academic Exchange Service, DAAD
- The State University of New York Research Foundation

Her distinctions include: Princeton University Honorary Fellow; Visiting Faculty Fellow Center, at the Center for the Humanities, Wesleylan University; visiting fellow, at the International Institute for Social History, Amsterdam; guest member, Columbia University Seminar on Labor History; guest member, Columbia University Seminar on Latin American History.

In 2006, she was awarded the “Encomienda al Mérito Civil” from the Spanish Government for her exceptional contributions in Spanish history and the study of Spanish immigrants in Mexico. In 2007, Mexico City's Institute of Science and Technology (ICyT) created the Clara E. Lida Award under the category “Education, Science and Society”. In 2009, the University of Cadiz awarded her an honorary doctorate (honoris causa).

== Bibliography ==
She is author or compiler of more than 20 books and over 150 articles in scholarly journals and book chapters. She also published a book of poetry, Variación última (2002), and has published other poems in various literary magazines.

=== Books ===
- La Revolución de 1868. Historia, pensamiento y literatura (1970)
- Anarquismo y revolución en la España del XIX (1972)
- La Mano Negra (1972)
- Antecedentes y desarrollo del movimiento obrero español (1973)
- Tres aspectos de la presencia española en México durante el Porfiriato (1981)
- La Casa de España en México (1988; 1992)
- El Colegio de México: una hazaña cultural (1990; 1993)
- Una inmigración privilegiada: los españoles en México (1994)
- Inmigración y exilio: reflexiones sobre el caso español (1997)
- España y el Imperio de Maximiliano (1999)
- La Casa de España y El Colegio de México: Memoria 1938-2000 (jointly with José Antonio Matesanz and Josefina Zoraida Vázquez) (2000)
- Trabajo, ocio y coacción. Trabajadores urbanos en México y Guatemala en el siglo XIX (2001)
- México y España durante el primer franquismo. Rupturas formales, relaciones oficiosas (2001)
- Trabajo, ocio y coacción en el siglo XIX (2003)
- Impulsos e inercias del cambio económico. Ensayos en honor de Nicolás Sánchez-Albornoz (2004).
- Argentina 1976. Estudios en torno al golpe de Estado (2007)
- Caleidoscopio del exilio. Actores, memoria, identidades (2009)
- La main noire. Anarchisme rural, sociétés clandestines et répression en Andalousie, 1870-1888 (2011)
- Cultura y práctica del anarquismo ibero-americano, desde sus orígenes hasta la Primera Guerra mundial (2012)
