= Soledad Loaeza =

Mexican academic (born 1950)

- Born: María de la Soledad Loaeza Tovar; April 29, 1950 (age 76); Mexico City, Mexico
- Education: Institute of Political Studies
- Occupations: Academic, writer, and intellectual
- Awards: National Prize for Arts and Sciences
- Website: www.soledadloaeza.com.mx

María de la Soledad Loaeza Tovar (born April 29, 1950) is a Mexican academic who specializes in the process of democratization and the transformations of society in Mexico.

== Biography ==
Soledad Loaeza completed her high school studies at UNAM's Vidal Castañeda y Najera National high school ((Plantel 4). She received a degree in international relations from El Colegio de México (Colmex), obtaining the title in 1972 with the thesis La política exterior del general Charles de Gaulle, 1962–1970 ("The foreign policy of General Charles de Gaulle, 1962–1970"). She traveled to Europe to study for an international relations specialization at the Geschwister-Scholl-Institut in Munich and a doctorate summa cum laude in political science at the Institute of Political Studies in Paris with the thesis Classes moyennes, démocratie et nationalisme au Mexique. L'éducation à la recherche du consensus ("Middle classes, democracy and nationalism in Mexico. Education in the search for consensus").

Loaeza has taught at the Colegio de México, the Ibero-American University (UIA), the Autonomous Technological Institute of Mexico (ITAM), the Autonomous Metropolitan University Iztapalapa (UAM-I) and at the UNAM School of Political and Social Sciences. She has also taught courses at institutes and universities in the United Kingdom, Spain, the United States, and France. She speaks five languages – Spanish, French, English, German, and Italian.

Since 1987, Loaeza has been a member of the Mexican Academy of Sciences. Since 1990, she has been a member of the International Political Science Association, becoming a member of the Executive Committee from 1991 to 1997. Since 2005, she has been a member of the American Political Science Association. From 2000 to 2006, she was a member of the Political Studies Association. Since 1988, she has been a member of the Latin American Studies Association. From 1997 to 1993, she was a member of the Association française de science politique.

Loaeza is a researcher and professor at the Colmex Center for International Studies. She has been a visiting researcher at the Institute for Political Studies in Paris, the University of Oxford, the Radcliffe Institute for Advanced Study at Harvard University, and the Kellogg Institute at the University of Notre Dame. She is a level III researcher for Mexico's National System of Investigators (Sistema Nacional de Investigadores).

== Awards and distinctions ==
- Prize for the best article on the history of Mexico from the Mexican Committee of Historical Sciences in 1998
- Research Award in Social Sciences from the Autonomous University of Nuevo León in 2001
- Radcliffe Fellowship from Harvard University in 2003
- Jesús Reyes Heroles Award from the Círculo de Estudios México in 2006
- Daniel Cosío Villegas Prize from the National Institute of Historical Studies of the Revolutions of Mexico (INEHRM) in 2008
- National Prize for Arts and Sciences in the area of History, Social Sciences, and Philosophy in 2010

== Published works ==
Loaeza has contributed as an editorialist for the newspaper La Jornada, has written more than 30 articles for various magazines, and has written more than 60 chapters for various books published in Mexico, France, the United Kingdom, Argentina, and the United States. She has written prologues and reviews for more than 30 works. She has translated works by Peter H. Smith, Samuel E. Finer, David A. Brading, and Donella H. Meadows. Her published books include:

- Clases medias y política en México. La querella escolar 1959-1963, 1968
- México: auge, crisis y ajuste, 1982-1988. Los años del cambio, 1992
- La cooperación internacional en un mundo desigual, 1994
- Oposición y democracia, 1996
- Reforma del Estado y democracia en América Latina, 1996
- El Partido Acción Nacional: la larga marcha 1939-1994. Oposición leal y partido de protesta, 1999
- Del popularismo de los antiguos al populismo de los modernos, 2001
- "Siglo XX", Volume V of the Gran Historia Ilustrada de México, 2002
- Entre lo posible y lo probable. La experiencia de la transición en México, 2008
- Las consecuencias políticas de la expropiación bancaria, 2008
- Acción Nacional: el apetito y las responsabilidades del triunfo, 2010
