= Jacqueline Peschard =

Mexican sociologist

Jacqueline Peschard Mariscal
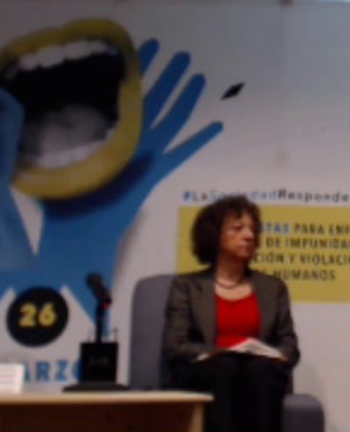
- Born: Mexico City, Mexico
- Occupation: Sociologist
- Title: President Commissioner
- Board member of: Federal Institute for Access to Public Information (2009-2013)

Academic background
- Education: Universidad Nacional Autónoma de México (BA, MA); El Colegio de Michoacán (PhD)

Academic work
- Discipline: Sociology, political science
- Sub-discipline: Constitutional democracy, electoral politics
- Institutions: Universidad Nacional Autónoma de México

Jacqueline Peschard Mariscal is a Mexican sociologist who specializes in electoral integrity and democracy studies. She was President Commissioner of the Federal Institute for Access to Public Information from 2009 until 2013. She also served as Counselor to the Instituto Nacional Electoral from 1997 to 2003. In 2010, she was elected president of the Iberoamerican Network of Data Protection (RIPD), which is a forum for promoting the universal right to data protection across Latin America.

She currently teaches at the Universidad Nacional Autónoma de México in Mexico City.

== Education ==
Peschard has bachelor's and master's degrees from UNAM and a doctorate from El Colegio de Michoacán.

== Research ==
She has taught at El Colegio de México, the Instituto Tecnológico Autónomo de México and the Universidad Nacional Autónoma de México.

She has been a member of the Sistema Nacional de Investigadores Level II since October 2004.

In 2004, she was an advisor to the United Nations Electoral Assistance Division on election stability in Iraq.

== Published works ==
- Transparencia: Promesas y Desafíos (Grandes Problemas) (El Colegio de México Press, 2017), ASIN B07CT3WBD8
- Mexico's Democratic Challenges: Politics, Government, and Society (Stanford University Press, 2010), ISBN 978-0804771610
- El Federalismo Electoral en Mexico (Miguel Angel Porrua, 2008), ISBN 978-9708191036
- 2 de Julio Reflexiones y Alternativas (UNAM Press, 2007), ISBN 978-9703246359
- Hacia la Sociología (Addison Wesley Longman, March 2000), ISBN 978-9684442658
