= Patrick Low =

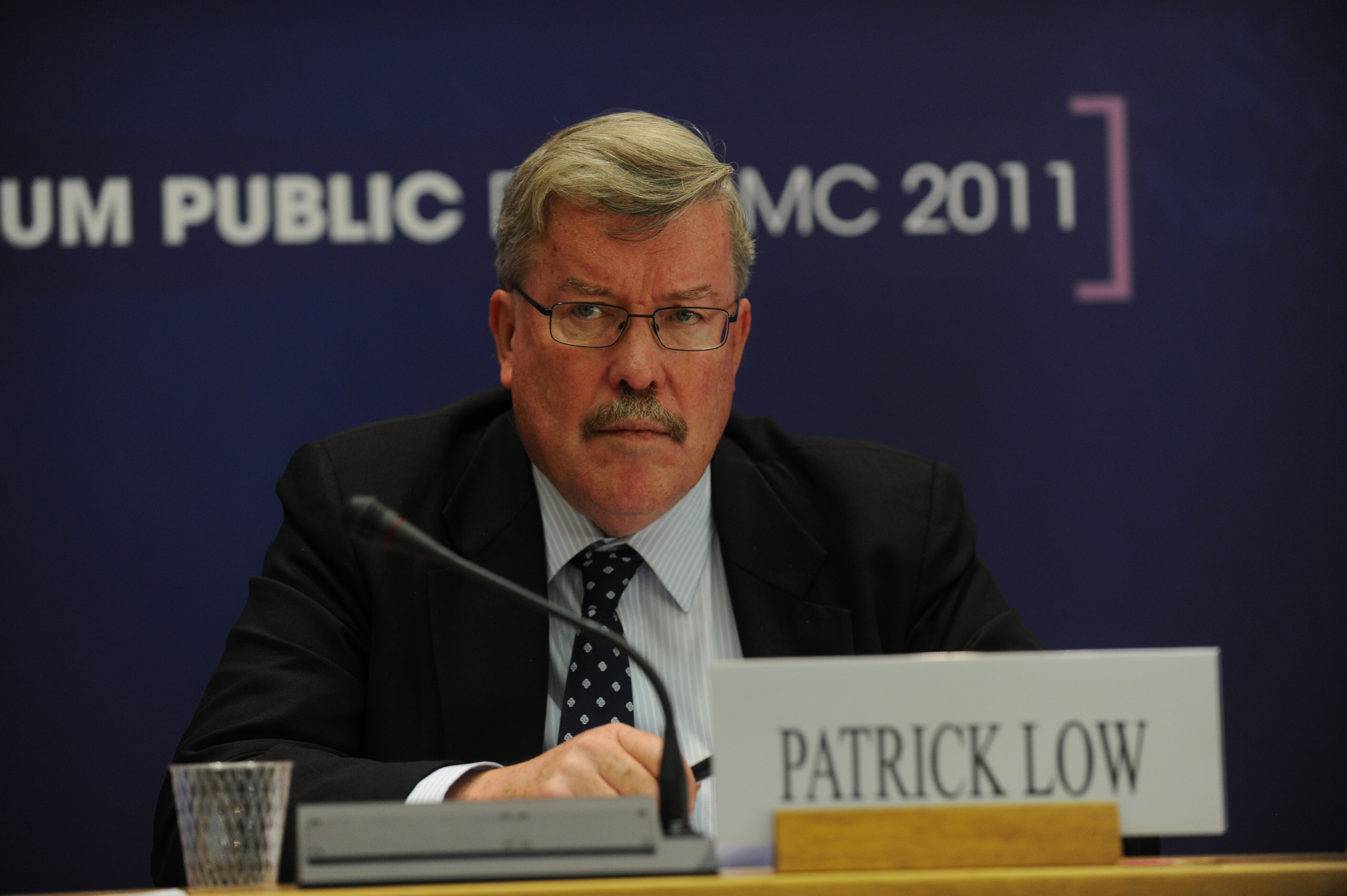
Low in 2001

Patrick Low was the Chief Economist at the World Trade Organization Secretariat and an honorary professor of international economics at the Graduate Institute of International and Development Studies in Geneva.

For a short interlude from 1999–2001, Low served as WTO Director-General Mike Moore's Chief of Staff. He has taught at Colegio de México and has been adjunct professor at the Kent State University Geneva Semester Programme since 1996. He holds a PhD in economics from Sussex University.
