= Francisco Gil Villegas =

Mexican political scientist (born 1953)

Francisco Gil Villegas Montiel is a Mexican political scientist and professor, most strongly associated with the National Autonomous University of Mexico (UNAM) and El Colegio de México.

== Education ==
Francisco Gil Villegas received a bachelor's degree in international relations and a master's in political science from El Colegio de México, a doctorate in political science from UNAM and a doctorate in political studies from Balliol College, University of Oxford, under the supervision of Stephen Lukes.

== Academic career ==
From 1981 to 1982, Villegas was visiting investigator of the Institute of Sociology of the University of Heidelberg. He has worked as a professor at the UNAM and El Colegio de México amongst others. At El Colegio de México he taught courses including: the History of political ideas; Introduction to the Social Sciences; and Political Theory as part of the college's Political Science MA. In addition, he is member of the National System of Investigators, Level III; President of the Comisión Evaluadora del Sistema Nacional de Investigadores in the area of Social Sciences; and member of the Comisión Dictaminadora for Income and Promotion of UNAM's Facultad de Ciencias Políticas y Sociales (FCPyS). Gil Villegas is the general editor for the translation of Max Weber's works in the Fondo de Cultura Económica, the main publishing house in Latin America.

=== Fields of investigation ===
- Max Weber and the Hundred Years' War. Analysis of the centennial polemics around the Weberian thesis on the relation between the Protestant ethics and the mentality of modern capitalism (1904–2005).
- Heidegger, Lukács, Ortega, Scheler, Hartmann, Mannheim and Max Weber in the Zeitgeist of the European culture of the first third of the 20th century.
- Relations between Mexico and the European Union.
- Relations in Eastern Europe: Recent conflict in Kosovo and Georgia.

== Other activities ==
Aside from his academic career, Villegas has been a commentator on many radio and television programs, including since 1998 Enfoque: Diario Hablado on Núcleo Radio Mil. Between 1994 and 1999 he also acted as a consultant for the Institute of European and Latin American Relations (IRELA), financed by the European Parliament, by invitation of its general director, Wolf Grabendorff.

Villegas was director of the magazine Foro Internacional from 1993 to 1998. From 1997 he was a member of the editorial council of Metapolítica, the quarterly magazine of theory and political science of the Comparative Politics Studies Center, and from 1998 for political studies, by the Faculty of Social and Political Sciences of UNAM.

He received a doctorate honoris causa from the University of the Planalto Central of Brasília, Brazil on November 29, 2001.

== Publications ==
=== Books ===
- The Prophets and the Messiah. Lukács and Ortega as the precursors of Heidegger in the Zeitgeist of modernity (1900–1929), Mexico, Fondo de Cultura Economica, 1ª ed., 1996 (2ª ed. 1998), 560 pp.
- (With Rogelio Hernández et al.), The legislators before the political reforms of Mexico, El Colegio de México-Cámara de Diputados, 2001, 233 pp.
- Max Weber: The Protestant ethics and the spirit of the capitalism, critical edition, notes, introductory study and translation of the German of "My final word to my critics" (1910) of Francisco Gil Villegas M., Mexico, Fondo de Cultura Economica, 2003, 564 pp.

=== Chapters in books and articles ===
- "Political parties and electoral systems in Mexico and Germany", in Carlos Dawn (coord.), Mexico and Germany: two countries in transition, El Colegio de México, 1996.
- "Mexikos Annäherung go Österreich", Zeitschrift für Lateinamerika Wien, no 50, 1996.
- "The complete works of Heidegger and the genesis of Sein und Zeit", Dianoia. Yearbook of Philosophy, Mexico, unam-fce, vol. xli, 1995 (published in March 1997).
- "The philosophical base of the theory of the modernity in Simmel", Sociological Studies, El Colegio de México, vol. xv, no. 43, April–September 1997.
- "The challenges to the sovereignty before the globalization", in Ilán Bizberg (coord.), Mexico before the end of the Cold War, Mexico, El Colegio de México, 1998.
- "Mexico, Europe and Austria", Foro Internacional, núm.152–153, April–September 1998.
- "The theory of modernity in Simmel", in Gina Zabludovsky (coord.), sociological Theory and modernity, Mexico, unam–Plaza Váldez, 1998.
- "Of the monarcómacos to the Statement of the Rights of Man passing for the theory of sovereignty", in Fernando Mountain Migallón (coord.), Homage to Rafael Segovia, Mexico, El Fondo de Cultura Economica-CONACYT, 1998.
- "Mexico and the European Union: a project of foreign policy", Foro Internacional, núm.156–157, April–September 1999.
- "The political bases of the theory of public administration" and "Decentralization and democracy: a theoretical perspective", in José Luis Méndez (coord.), basic Readings of administration and public politics, Mexico, El Colegio de México, 2000.
- "The concept of rationality in Max Weber", in Carmen Trueba Atienza (coord.), Rationality: language, argument and action, Mexico, UAM–Plaza Váldez, 2000.
- "German-Mexican cultural relations: the philosophical dimension", in Lion Bieber (comp..), The German-Mexican relations since the contribute of the brothers Humboldt to the present, Mexico, El Colegio de México-UNAM, 2001.
- "Heidegger and Nazism according to Víctor Farías, or the hidden agenda to discredit an upper thought", Theoría. Magazine of the School of Philosophy, Faculty of Philosophy and Letters, UNAM, no. 11–12, December 2001.
- "Mexico and the European Union in the six-year period of Zedillo", in Humberto Heron Elizondo and Susana Lizard (comps.), Between the globalization and dependence. The foreign policy of Mexico 1994–2000, Mexico, El Colegio de México-ITESM, 2002.
- "The Switchman. Fragments of the 'Introduction of the publisher' to the critical edition of Max Weber's "The protestant ethics and the spirit of capitalism", in Metapolítica, no. 26–27, November 2002 – February 2003.
- "Context of the polemics that carried Max Weber to write in 1910 "My final word to my critics", Mexican Magazine of Political Sciences, UNAM, no. 186, September–December 2002.
- "Max Weber and its sources: history of an argument", La Gaceta del Fondo de Cultura Económica, no. 390, July 2003.
- "Nietzsche and the German culture in the first third of the 20th century", in Paulina Rivero Weber and Greta Rivara (comps.), Nietzschean Perspectives . Reflections around the thought of Nietzsche, Mexico, UNAM, 2003.
