= Mario Ojeda Gómez =

Mexican scholar and internationalist (1927–2013)

Mario Ojeda Gómez (10 August 1927 – 1 November 2013) was a Mexican scholar and internationalist. He served as president and later Professor Emeritus at El Colegio de México (1997). He was Mexico's Ambassador to UNESCO from 1995 to 1998.

Ojeda Gómez was also Investigador Nacional Emérito (Emeritus Fellow) of the Sistema Nacional de Investigadores (SNI), the México's National System of Researchers (2005).

Ojeda Gómez obtained his bachelor's degree in international relations from the School of Political and Social Sciences (Facultad de Ciencias Políticas y Sociales) of the Universidad Nacional Autónoma de México, of which he was part of its founding generation; he also undertook his graduate studies at Harvard University, where he studied under John Kenneth Galbraith, Henry Kissinger and Hans Morgenthau, among others. Ojeda Gómez crucially adapted Realism in International Relations to the study of Mexican Foreign Policy.

== Professional trajectory ==
Ojeda Gómez was Professor at El Colegio de Mexico for over 50 years (1962–2013). He was also visiting professor at the Massachusetts Institute of Technology (1978) and at the Fundación Ortega y Gasset, Madrid, Spain, (1984–1985). Visiting Scholar at the Brookings Institution, Washington, D.C. (1968–1969) and at the Royal Institute of International Affairs (Chatham House), London, England (1977). Ojeda Gómez was the president of El Colegio de México from 1985 to 1995 and was Mexico's Ambassador to UNESCO from 1995 to 1998.

== Publications ==
Ojeda Gómez is the author of La protección de los trabajadores migratorios, México, Edición del Autor, 1957. Alcances y Límites de la política exterior de México. Mexico, El Colegio de Mexico, 1976, now a classic study on Mexican Foreign Policy; Mexico: El surgimiento de una politica exterior activa. Mexico, SEP, Serie Foro 2000, 1986, and México antes y después de la alternancia política. Un testimonio. Mexico, El Colegio de Mexico, 2004, in which he analyzed political change in Mexico. In 2007 he published Retrospección de Contadora: Los esfuerzos de México para la paz en Centroamérica (1983–1985).México, El Colegio de México, 2007, and received a tribute from El Colegio de México for his eightieth birthday and 45 years of academic service to the institution. In 2009, Ojeda Gomez published México y Cuba revolucionaria. Cincuenta años de relación.México, El Colegio de México, an essay on fifty years of uninterrupted Mexican-Cuban diplomatic relations, through the ups and downs of the Cuban Revolution and the Mexican political alternance. In April 2013, months prior to his death, Ojeda Gómez published his memoirs: Memorias, México, D.F, Edición de Autor, 2013, spanning his 86 years of fruitful life, from his early childhood to his highly productive old age.
