= Garciadiego =

Garciadiego is a surname. Notable people with the surname include:

- Javier Garciadiego (born 1951), Mexican historian
- Paz Alicia Garciadiego (born 1949), Mexican screenwriter and scholar
