= Gabriela Cano Ortega =

Mexican historian

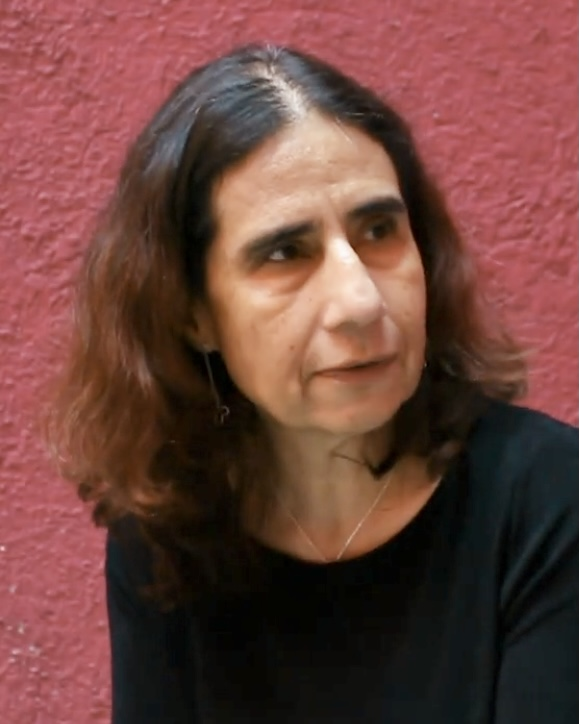
Cano in 2020

Ruth Gabriela Cano Ortega is a Mexican historian focused on the history of women in Mexico and sexual diversity during the Porfirian, revolutionary and post-revolutionary periods of Mexico. She specializes in gender analysis. Cano is a professor at the El Colegio de México.

Cano completed a Ph.D. in the history of Mexico at the School of Philosophy and Letters, UNAM. Her 1996 dissertation was titled, De la Escuela Nacional de Altos Estudios a la Facultad de Filosofia y Letras, 1910-1929 : un proceso de feminizacion. Her doctoral advisor was Javier Garciadiego.

Cano is a member of the Mexican Academy of Sciences.

== Selected works ==
- Cano, Gabriela; Radkau, Verena (1989). Ganando espacios: historias de vida : Guadalupe Zúñiga, Alura Flores y Josefina Vicens, 1920-1940 (in Spanish). Universidad Autonoma Metropolitana. ISBN 978-968-840-685-4.
- Cano, Gabriela; Peña, Ana Lidia García (1991). El maestro rural: una memoria colectiva (in Spanish). Consejo Nacional de Fomento Educativo. ISBN 978-968-29-3363-9.
- Cano, Gabriela; José Valenzuela, Georgette Emilia, eds. (2001). Cuatro estudios de género en el México urbano del siglo XIX. México, D.F.: Programa Universitario de Estudios de Género. ISBN 970-701-201-3. OCLC 51798811.
- Cano, Gabriela; Olcott, Jocelyn; Vaughan, Mary Kay, eds. (2006). Sex in Revolution: Gender, Politics, and Power in Modern Mexico. Duke University Press. ISBN 978-0-8223-3899-4.
- Cano, Gabriela (2010). Se llamaba Elena Arizmendi. México, D.F.: Tusquets Editores. ISBN 978-607-421-154-2. OCLC 650761621.
- Cano, Gabriela, ed. (2011). Amalia de Castillo Ledón: mujer de letras, mujer de poder. México, D.F. ISBN 978-607-455-707-7. OCLC 783791291.
