= El Colegio de México =

Higher education public institution in Mexico City

- El Colegio de México in 2024
- Type: Public
- Established: October 8, 1940
- Endowment: US $47.46 million (2011)
- President: Ana Covarrubias Velasco
- Faculty: 178
- Students: 440
- Undergraduates: 110
- Postgraduates: 330
- Location: Mexico City, Mexico
- Campus: Urban
- Colors: Crimson
- Website: Colmex.mx

El Colegio de México, A.C. (commonly known as Colmex, English: The College of Mexico) is a Mexican institute of higher education, specializing in teaching and research in social sciences and humanities.

The college was founded in 1940 by the Mexican Federal Government, the Bank of Mexico (Banco de México), the National Autonomous University of Mexico (UNAM), and the Fondo de Cultura Económica. In the late 1930s, following the end of the Spanish Civil War, Mexican president Lázaro Cardenas created the House of Spain in Mexico (1938–1940) to host Spanish intellectuals in exile in Mexico; Mexico was the only country that in 1939 welcomed Spanish refugees. Under the direction of intellectual Alfonso Reyes, the House of Spain became a higher education center, and was renamed El Colegio de México in 1940. The College now operates under a 1961 charter that allows the institution to provide college-level teaching in the fields of humanistic knowledge and social and political sciences. In 1976, the university's campus was moved from the Colonia Roma (a historic neighborhood just west of the city's center) to its current location in the southern portion of the capital; the main building of the campus was designed by the Mexican architect Teodoro González de León. The college contains seven separate academic centers collectively offering three undergraduate degrees, seven master's degrees and eight doctoral degrees.

El Colegio de México received the Prince of Asturias Award for Social Sciences in 2001. Colmex's library (Biblioteca Daniel Cosío Villegas), one of the largest academic libraries in Mexico, contains one of the most important Latin American collections in the fields of the social sciences and humanities.

== History ==
Colmex arose from an organization of Spanish civil war exiles called "Casa de España en México" (House of Spain in Mexico). In March 1939, Lázaro Cárdenas named Alfonso Reyes to the presidency of the "Casa de España en México". Reyes would be president of the "Colegio" until his death. Historian Daniel Cosío Villegas played an important role in its institutionalization and the Colegio's library bears his name.

== Academics ==
=== Students ===
Demographics of El Colegio de México
	Undergraduate	Graduate	Ph.D.
Men	57%	49%	44%
Women	43%	51%	56%
International Students	4%	12%	30%

Colmex's student population includes 74 undergraduate and 369 graduate students representing diverse geographic and linguistic backgrounds. Of the entire student population, 83.5% are from Mexico, while 16.05% are from outside the country (including the United States, France, Italy and China). International students hail from about 24 different countries, with Colombians comprising about one third of all international students in the entering class of 2011.

University rankings

Global – Overall
- QS World: 901-950 (2026)

Undergraduate and graduate admission to Colmex is very selective. El Colegio de México received 936 applications for admission to the Class of 2014 and 181 were admitted (18.1%). 87% of students graduate within 4 years.

=== Research Centers ===
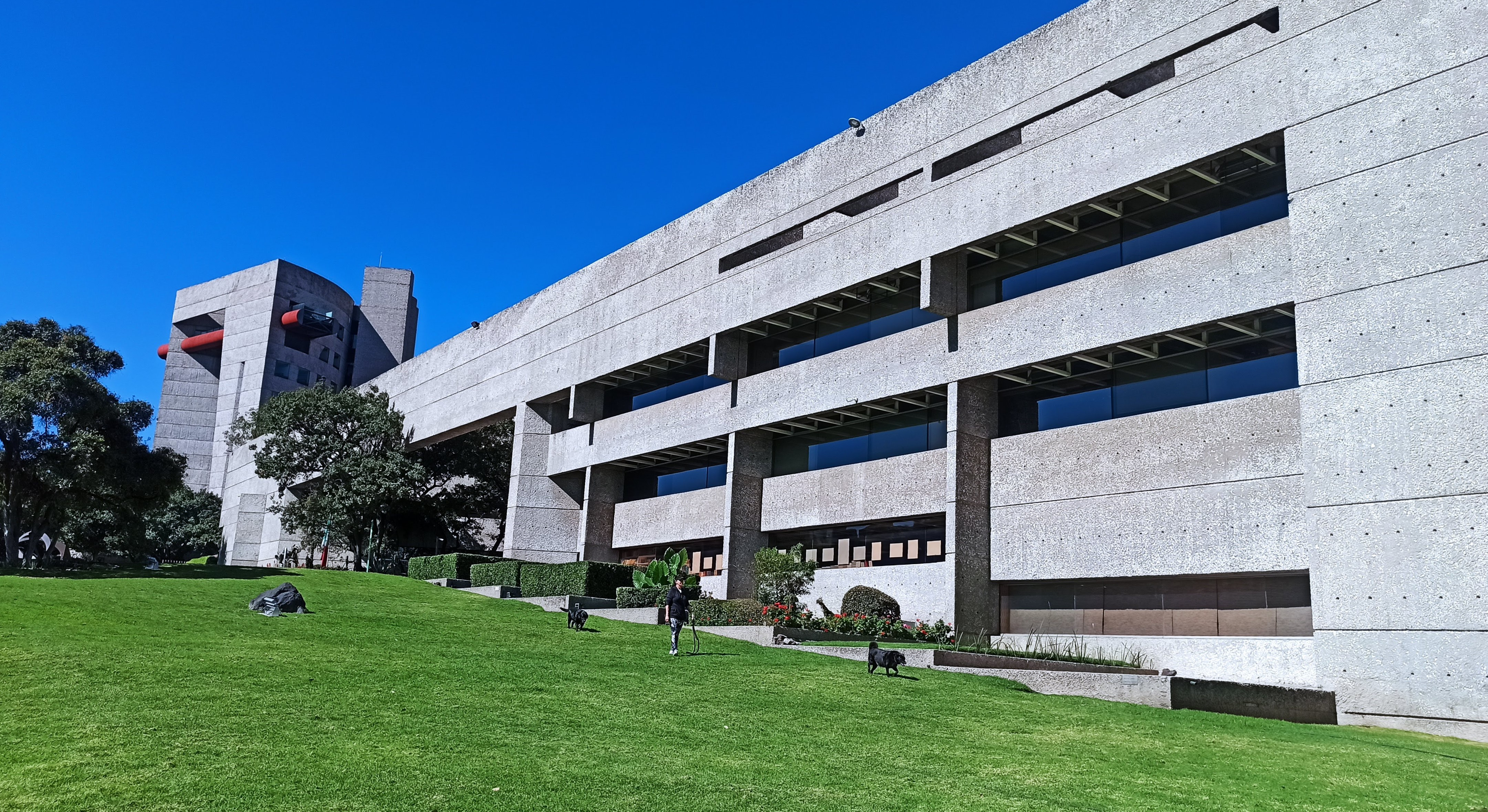
El Colegio de México in 2024

In the 2010–2011 school year, El Colegio de México offered 19 academic programs in seven academic centers, of which 16 are doctoral and master's graduate degree programs. Despite strong increases in university enrollment across Mexico, El Colegio de México has upheld a student-faculty ratio of 2.5:1. There are nearly 181 tenured or tenure-track professors and 50 adjunct and visiting professors teaching at the college.

21% of all students are enrolled in the Centre for International Studies, Colmex's largest academic unit. Of the other larger centers, the Centre for Demographic, Urban and Environmental Studies enrolls 19%, the Centre for Historical Studies enrolls 15%, the Centre for Linguistic and Literary Studies enrolls 13%, the Centre for Economic Studies and the Centre for Sociological Studies enroll about 10% each. The remainder of all students are enrolled in Colmex's smaller schools, including the Centre of Asian and African Studies, founded by Flora Botton; the Gender Studies Program, founded by Lourdes Arizpe, Botton, and Elena Urrutia; and the Daniel Cosío Villegas Library, which is also one of the richest libraries in North America, with sources in many languages.

Since 1991, El Colegio de México is the host institution of LEAD-Mexico (Leadership for Environment and Development), a program established by The Rockefeller Foundation to bring together and train mid-career leaders from all parts of the world in improving their leadership skills around the issues of sustainable development . Led primarily by renowned Colmex professor Boris Graizbord, Lead Mexico responds to calls for acting as consultant, advisor, and policy evaluator at federal and local level.

In 2021 a Centre for Gender Studies was inaugurated.

Centers of El Colegio de México
- Centre for Historical Studies
- Centre for Linguistic and Literary Studies
- Centre for Studies of Asia and Africa
- Centre for Economic Studies
- Centre for Demographic, Urban and Environmental Studies
- Centre for International Studies
- Centre for Sociological Studies
- Centre for Gender Studies
- Daniel Cosío Villegas Library

== Exchange and cooperation arrangements (2021) ==
Canada

- Glendon College
- Queen's University
- Université du Québec à Montréal
- University of British Columbia
- Université de Montréal

United States

- Yale University
- Tulane University
- American University
- Johns Hopkins University
- State University of New York
- University of Chicago
- The University of Texas at San Antonio

Korea

- Dongguk University
- Hankuk University of Foreign Studies
- Seoul National University
- Busan University of Foreign Studies

India

- University of Delhi
- Jadavpur University
- Jawaharlal Nehru University

Israel

- Hebrew University of Jerusalem

Japan

- Ritsumeikan University
- Hitotsubashi University
- Tsukuba University
- Keio University
- Waseda University
- Institute of Developing Economies
- Kyoto University of Foreign Studies
- Tokio University

Germany

- Humboldt University of Berlin
- LMU Munich
- University of Cologne
- Heidelberg University
- University of Hamburg
- Leipzig University
- Free University of Berlin
- University of Bamberg
- Heinrich Heine University Düsseldorf
- Max Planck Institute for Foreign and International Social Law

Netherlands

- Leiden University

United Kingdom

- University College London

Switzerland

- Graduate Institute of International and Development Studies

== Daniel Cosío Villegas Library ==
The Daniel Cosío Villegas Library is a public academic library situated in the center of El Colegio de México's campus, contains around 700,000 volumes, and comprises 30% of the total building real estate. The library is composed of eighteen academic librarians, three IT professionals, and eighty clerical staff and paraprofessionals. The library's curatorial efforts have transformed the collection into one of the most important Latin America collections in its areas of specialty and its staff has played an important role both for the campus and the national academic library practices by driving various initiatives such as the migration to online OPAC systems in the 90's, which spurred other institutions in Mexico to follow.

== Notable people ==
Presidents of El Colegio de México
Alfonso Reyes	1940–1958
Daniel Cosío Villegas	1958–1963
Silvio Zavala	1963–1966
Víctor Luis Urquidi Bingham	1966–1985
Mario Ojeda Gómez	1985–1994
Andrés Lira	1994–2005
Francisco Javier Garciadiego Dantán	2005–2015
Silvia Giorguli Saucedo	2015–present

=== Faculty and staff ===
Prominent scholars and intellectuals have been among the faculty of the various centers, such as Alfonso Reyes, Daniel Cosío Villegas, Silvio Zavala, Mario Ojeda Gómez, Raimundo Lida, José Gaos, Víctor Urquidi, Luis González y González, Luis Unikel and Rafael Segovia Canosa.

For 2020, from a total of 173 faculty and staff members, 91% were affiliated with the National System of Researchers (abbreviated as SNI, in Spanish) of the Consejo Nacional de Ciencia y Tecnología (the National Council of Science and Technology of Mexico).

Among the best-known faculty of El Colegio de México are Lorenzo Meyer, Mauricio Merino, Antonio Alatorre; political leaders Jesús Silva Herzog Flores, Carlos Tello Macías, Manuel Camacho Solís, Natividad González Parás, Porfirio Muñoz Ledo, Bernardo Sepúlveda, José Ramón Cossío; scholars Sergio Aguayo, Josefina Zoraida Vázquez, Carlos Marichal, Clara Lida, Carlos Urzúa, Soledad Loaeza, Jacqueline Peschard, Brígida García Guzmán, Fernando Escalante Gonzalbo, David Lorenzen, Jorge Alberto Lozoya, Gabriela Cano Ortega, Ruy Mauro Marini, José Luis Lezama, Orlandina de Oliveira, Rodolfo Stavenhagen, Luis F. Aguilar Villanueva, Pilar Gonzalbo Aizpuru, Francisco Gil Villegas, Margit Frenk, Francisco Segovia, Saurabh Dube, Joseph Hodara, Gustavo Garza, Robert Pastor, Martha Schteingart; and diplomats such as Mauricio de María y Campos and Fernando de Mateo.

=== Alumni ===
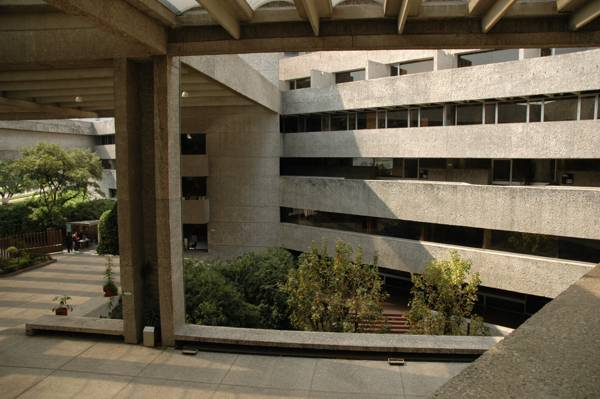

Among the people who have attended El Colegio de México are Mexican political leaders Marcelo Ebrard, Secretary of Foreign Affairs, former Head of Government of Mexico City; economist Arturo Herrera Gutiérrez cabinet member under the Andrés Manuel López Obrador administration; economist Graciela Márquez Colín former Secretary of Economy, under the Andrés Manuel López Obrador administration; economist Jaime Serra Puche, cabinet member under the Carlos Salinas and Ernesto Zedillo administrations; Jesús Seade Andrés Manuel López Obrador's representative in the renegotiation of NAFTA; Sócrates Rizzo, former Governor of Nuevo León, Marco Antonio Mena Rodríguez Governor of Tlaxcala and Enrique Alfaro Ramírez Governor of Jalisco.

Diplomats: Patricia Espinosa, executive director of United Nations Framework Convention on Climate Change, former Secretary of Foreign Affairs, Arturo Sarukhán, former Mexican ambassador to the United States, Enrique Berruga, former Permanent Representative of Mexico to the United Nations; Claude Heller, ambassador of Mexico to the UN, Adolfo Aguilar Zínser, former ambassador of Mexico to the UN Security Council, senator Rosario Green, Secretary of Foreign Affairs during the Zedillo administration, Bruno Figueroa Fischer Ambassador or Mexico to the Republic of Korea.

Intellectuals and academics: historians Enrique Krauze, Andrés Reséndez; and Javier Garciadiego member of El Colegio Nacional (Mexico) and director of Academia Mexicana de la Historia; sociologist Julio Boltvinik and Pablo González Casanova rector at Autonomous National University of Mexico; writers such as Pablo Soler Frost, Silvio Zavala, Héctor Aguilar Camín, and Margarita Peña; Secretary of State of the Mexican State of Nuevo León and former Senior Vice President of Cemex Javier Trevino; economists Gustavo Garza Villarreal; political scientists Soledad Loaeza and Francisco Gil Villegas; political analyst and writer Denise Dresser; current president of Salisbury University in Salisbury, Maryland, Janet Dudley-Eshbach; and narratologist Lauro Zavala.

== Publications ==
- de la Torre Villar, Ernesto (1981). de la Torre Villar, Ernesto (ed.). Asia and Colonial Latin America: XXX International Congress of Human Sciences in Asia and North Africa. Contributors Ernesto de la Torre Villar, El Colegio de México (illustrated ed.). El Colegio de México. ISBN 9681201140.
