= Julio Boltvinik =

Mexican academic and politician

Julio Boltvinik Kalinka

Member of the Chamber of Deputies
- In office September 2003 – August 2006

Personal details
- Born: 10 March 1944 (age 82) Puebla, Puebla, Mexico
- Party: PRI and PRD
- Education: National Autonomous University of Mexico; El Colegio de México; University of East Anglia (MA)

Julio Boltvinik Kalinka (born 10 March 1944) is a Mexican academic and politician who served as PRI and PRD member of the Chamber of Deputies in the LIX Legislature of the Mexican Congress from September 2003 to August 2006. He was educated at the National Autonomous University of Mexico, El Colegio de México (Economics) and the University of East Anglia (MA, Development Economics). He completed his Ph.D. at the Centro de Investigación y Estudios Superiores de Antropología Social in Guadalajara. He has been Professor at El Colegio de México since 1992.
