= Lauro Zavala =

Mexican scholar

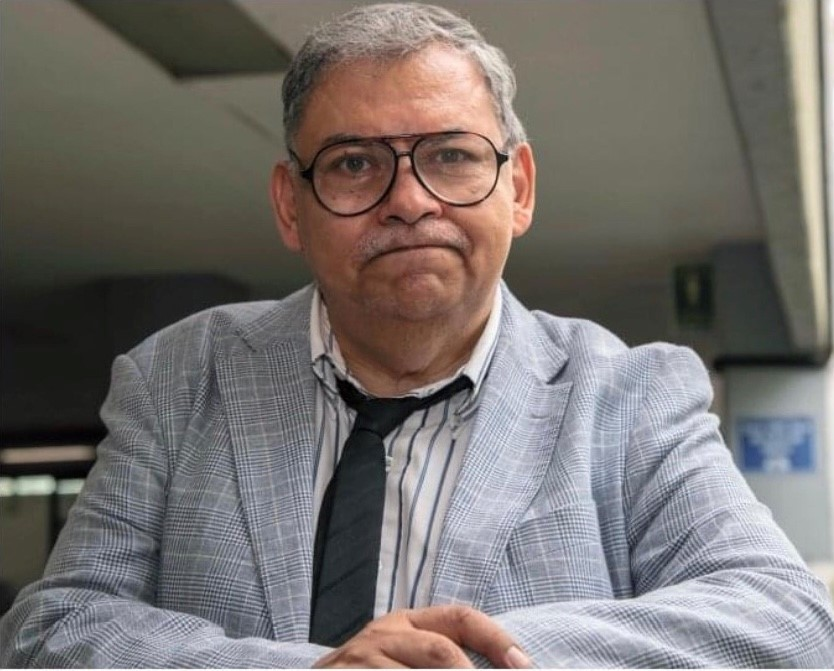
Lauro Zavala en la Unidad Xochimilco de la Universidad Autónoma Metropolitana.

Lauro Zavala (born December 30, 1954, in Mexico City) is a scholarly researcher, known for his work on literary theory, semiotics and film, especially in relation to irony, metafiction and micro-narratives. Faculty professor since 1984 at Universidad Autónoma Metropolitana, Xochimilco, in Mexico City, where he is head of the area on Intertextual Semiotics.

He holds a PhD in Literature at El Colegio de México. He is author of a dozen books, and over 150 articles published in books and journals in the US, UK, France, Spain and another 15 countries. His works have been quoted in more than 3000 books and specialized journals. He has presented the results of his research in more than 300 scholarly conferences around the world and has tutored more than 150 dissertations. The National University (UNAM) has produced a DVD based on his textbook on film analysis. Chair of the Permanent Seminar on Film Analysis (SEPANCINE) since 2005, he organizes a National Conference on Film Analysis.

Zavala is the author of a series of models for textual and intertextual analysis as a contribution to the so-called intersemiotic translation. These pedagogical models are designed to analyze short stories, novels, feature films and documentaries, and other forms of narrative, as well as photographs and many other cultural products.

At the core of his work is a theory on the formal components of postmodern cultural products. Paradigmatic Formalism is a response to Russian Formalism, French deconstruction and other European-based literary theories, and it is the result of studying Spanish American literature, where the key element is not the moral evolution of the main character, but experimentation with language itself.

According to this theory, one key element in postmodern culture is the tendency to produce the highest possible complexity in materials of extreme brevity. Arising from the mixed and paradoxical condition of the regional culture, the genre of the so-called micro-stories was born in early twentieth century in Latin American literature.

== Published books ==
=== Film analysis ===
- Material inflamable. Reseñas y crítica de cine (UAMX, 1989)
- Permanencia voluntaria. El cine y su espectador (UV, 1994)
- Elementos del discurso cinematográfico (UAMX, 2005). Award to the University Textbook at Universidad Autónoma Metropolitana - Xochimilco
- La seducción luminosa. Teoría y práctica del análisis cinematográfico (Trillas, 2010).
- Translation into Spanish and preface to Robert Stam's Teoría y práctica de la adaptación (CUEC, UNAM, 2015)
- Estética y semiótica del cine. Hacia una teoría paradigmática (UNAM, 2023)

=== Semiotics ===
- La precisión de la incertidumbre. Posmodernidad, vida cotidiana y escritura (UAEM, 2005).
- Manual de análisis narrativo (Trillas, 2007).
- Ironías de la ficción y la metaficción en cine y literatura (UACM, 2008).
- Antimanual del museólogo. Hacia una museología de la vida cotidiana (UAM/INAH, 2012).

=== Interdisciplinarity ===
- Instrucciones para asesinar a un profesor. Viñetas de la vida académica (Praxis/UABCS, 2008).
- De la investigación al libro. Estudios y crónicas de bibliofilia (UNAM, 2014).
- Semiótica preliminar. Ensayos como conjeturas (FOEM, 2015).
- Bibliografía de la investigación sobre literatura y cine en México, 2001-2014 (UNAM, 2016).
- Semiótica fronteriza (FOEM, 2021).
- Pasajero en tránsito. Experiencias infrecuentes de un viajero frecuente (GM Querétaro, 2023).

=== Literary analysis ===
- Paseos por el cuento mexicano contemporáneo (Nueva Imagen, 2004).
- Cartografías del cuento y la minificción (Renacimiento, Sevilla, España, 2005).
- La minificción bajo el microscopio (UNAM, 2006).
- Cómo estudiar el cuento (Trillas, 2009).

== Literary anthologies ==
- Humor e ironía en el cuento mexicano (Asoc. Escrit. Uruguay, 1992, 2 vols.).
- La palabra en juego. El nuevo cuento mexicano (Univ. Aut. Edo. México, 1993).
- Teorías de los cuentistas (UNAM, 1993).
- La escritura del cuento (UNAM, 1995).
- Poéticas de la brevedad (UNAM, 1996).
- Cuentos sobre el cuento (UNAM, 1998).
- Borges múltiple. Cuentos y ensayos de cuentistas (en colaboración con Pablo Brescia, UNAM, 1999).
- Relatos vertiginosos. Antología de cuentos mínimos (Alfaguara Juvenil, 2000).

Book selected in 2001 to be published by the Mexican Ministry of Education (45,000 copies distributed in public libraries and schools).

- La ciudad escrita. Humor e ironía en el cuento urbano (El Ermitaño, 2000).
- Relatos mexicanos posmodernos. Prosa ultrabreve, lúdica e híbrida (Alfaguara Juvenil, 2001). Book selected in 2004 to be published by the Mexican Ministry of Education.
- El dinosaurio anotado. Edición crítica de 'El dinosaurio' de Augusto Monterroso (Alfaguara Juvenil, 2002).
- La minificción en México: 50 textos breves (UPN, Colombia, 2002).
- Minificción mexicana (UNAM, Antologías Literarias del Siglo XX, 2003).

== Editorial work ==
- Editor, El Cuento en Red. Revista de Investigación en Teoría y Análisis Literario. Semestral, created in 2000 at UAM Xochimilco in collaboration with Humboldt State University.

== Publications ==
- Zavala, Lauro (2002). Quehacer editorial (in Spanish). Solar, Servicios Editoriales. Archived from the original on January 22, 2008.
- Zavala, Lauro (2005). Elementos del discurso cinematográfico (in Spanish). Universidad Autónoma Metropolitana-Unidad Xochimilco.
- Zavala, Lauro (2006). La precisión de la incertidumbre: posmodernidad vida cotidiana y escritura (in Spanish). Universidad Autónoma del Estado de México. ISBN 978-968-835-962-4.
- Zavala, Lauro (2006). La minificción bajo el microscopio (in Spanish). UNAM. ISBN 978-970-32-3602-2.
- Cine clásico, moderno y posmoderno
- Zavala, Lauro (31 August 2007). "Acercamiento". El País (in Spanish).
- 27 articles by L. Zavala published at UAM (Digital Library).
- El análisis cinematográfico y su diversidad metodológica
- La traducción intersemiótica en el cine de ficción
- Cine y literatura: Puentes, analogías y extrapolaciones
- La tendencia transdisciplinaria en los estudios culturales.
- Seis propuestas para un género del tercer milenio: Brevedad, Diversidad, Complicidad, Fractalidad, Fugacidad, Virtualidad.
- Elementos de análisis intertextual.
- El cuento ultracorto bajo el microscopio.
- El cuento ultracorto: hacia un nuevo canon literario.
- Diez razones para olvidar El dinosaurio de Monterroso.
- Glosario de términos de ironía narrativa.
