= Raimundo Lida =

Argentine philologist and literary critic (1908–1979)

Raimundo Lida (1908–1979) was an Argentine philologist, philosopher of language, literary critic and essayist. He specialised in Romance philology, aesthetics, the literature of the Spanish Golden Age and modernist literature. He taught at Harvard University from 1953, where he was chair of the department of Romance Languages. The second of three children, his siblings were the hematologist Emilio Lida and María Rosa Lida de Malkiel, also a philologist.

== Life ==
Lida was born to a Jewish family in Lemberg, the Austro-Hungarian Empire (now Ukraine). His parents took the family to Buenos Aires when he was a few months old. The family spoke Yiddish as a first language, but the children became assimilated. There he grew up and received a wholly secular education. His older brother Emilio became a hematologist and his younger sister Maria Rosa Lida also became a philologist.

In 1930 Lida became an Argentine citizen, after studying his high school at the Colegio Nacional Manuel Belgrano. He obtained a university degree in the Department of Philosophy and Literature at the University of Buenos Aires, where he graduated in 1931. He became a philologist under the influence of Amado Alonso, his teacher and mentor. His interest in philosophy was influenced by Alejandro Korn and Francisco Romero. He gained his doctorate at the University of Buenos Aires with a dissertation on aesthetics and language of Santayana, published in book form in 1943, by the University of Tucumán Press.

In 1931 he began working with Alonso and Pedro Henríquez Ureña at the Instituto de Filología, and was Assistant Editor of the "Revista de Filología Hiispánica". He also collaborated with Victoria Ocampo in "Sur", and in other literary reviews. Lida taught aesthetics and literature at the National University of La Plata, and Literature at the Instituto Superior del Profesorado Secundario and at the Colegio Libre de Estudios Superiores, in Buenos Aires.

In 1947, to escape the conditions under Juan Peron, he took his family into exile in Mexico. He was invited by Alfonso Reyes to El Colegio de México, where he founded the foremost scholarly journal, Nueva Revista de Filología Hispánica, and the Center for Linguistic and Literary Studies.

In 1953, Lida succeeded his former professor Amado Alonso, who had been teaching at Harvard University since 1946. Lida became chair of the department of Romance Languages and held the Smith Chair. In addition to his own work, he published translations into Spanish of a range of scientific, philosophical and literary works, by such authors as Moritz Geiger, Karl Vossler, Helmut Hatzfeld, George Santayana, W. Dilthey and Leo Spitzer.

In 1958 he became a naturalized US citizen.

== Marriage and family ==
Lida married Leonor García (1908–1999) in 1935. They had two children: Fernando (b. 1936) and Clara Lida (b. 1941), both born in Buenos Aires. They divorced after moving to the United States.

He married a second time, to Denah Levy (1923–2007), a Spanish scholar at Brandeis University. She wrote important works on Benito Pérez Galdós and a collection of Sephardic proverbs.

Raimundo Lida died in Cambridge, Massachusetts in 1979.

== Legacy and honors ==
- 1939 and 1960, Guggenheim fellowships
- 1954, honorary MA by Harvard University
- 1968, Smith Professor, Smith Chair, Harvard University
- 1970, elected to the American Academy of Arts and Sciences
- 1975, elected to the Academia Argentina de Letras

== Works ==
- Introducción a la estilística romance, Buenos Aires, 1932.
- With Amado Alonso, El impresionismo en el lenguaje, Buenos Aires, 1936.
- El concepto lingüístico del impresionismo, Buenos Aires, 1936.
- With Amado Alonso, El español en Chile, Buenos Aires, 1940.
- Belleza, arte y poesía en la estética de Santayana, Tucumán, 1943.
- Letras hispánicas, México, 1958 [reed.: 1981].
- Condición del poeta, Lima, 1961.
- Prosas de Quevedo, Barcelona,1980.
- Rubén Darío. Modernismo, Caracas, 1984.
- Estudios Hispánicos, México, 1988.
