= Jorge Alberto Lozoya =

Mexican diplomat (born 1943)

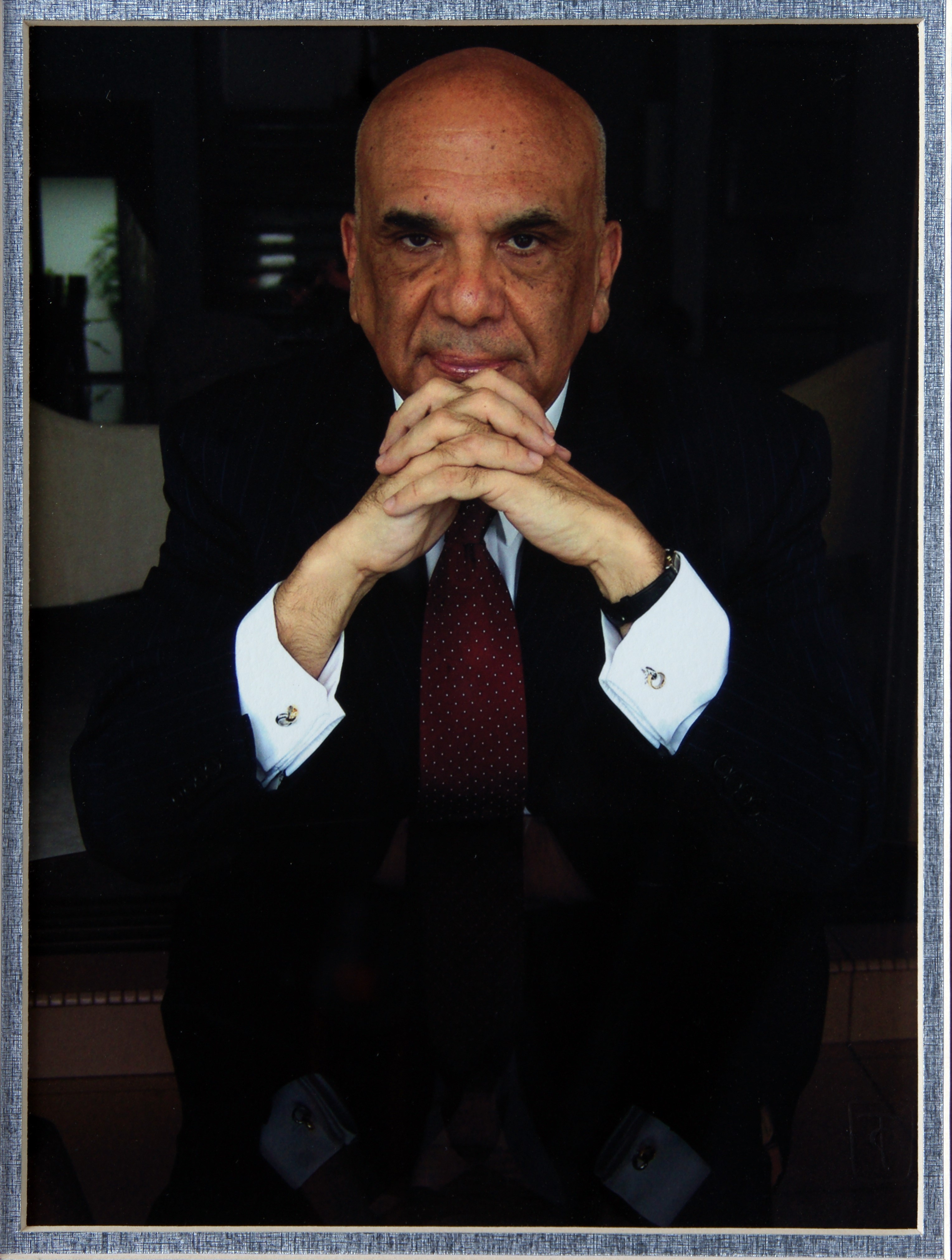
Jorge Alberto Lozoya

Jorge Alberto Lozoya Legorreta (born December 7, 1943) is a Mexican diplomat with broad experience in international cooperation and cultural affairs. He has also been associated with some of the top Mexican and international academic institutions, with special interest on Asian civilizations and prospective studies and international negotiations.

== Career ==
Jorge Alberto Lozoya holds degrees on international relations and history from El Colegio de México and Stanford University. A Latin American pioneer on Asian affairs, he has introduced two generations of Mexican internationalists to the study of Chinese, Japanese and Indian civilizations at El Colegio de Mexico, Mexico’s National University, the Ibero-American University and the Mexican Diplomatic Academy among other prestigious institutions.

In 1964 Lozoya designed the Chinese Hall at the Museum of World Cultures in Mexico City. During 1975 he served as Secretary General of the 30th International Congress of Human Sciences in Asia and North Africa. As Academic Director of the Center for Economic and Social Studies of the Third World, and with the support of UNITAR, he co-directed with Hungarian systems theorist Ervin László a broad analytic study on the future of the United Nations, published in 1980.

In 1999 Lozoya was unanimously elected by the governments of Latin American countries, Spain and Portugal to establish the Ibero-American Cooperation Secretariat, based in Madrid. Previously he had designed the scientific and technical cooperation network of the Asia-Pacific Economic Cooperation (APEC) organisation.

In the mass media field, Lozoya was a pioneer of Mexican public television (Channel 13) for which in 1972 created its international news division and later on produced and conducted many broadcasts. He has also regularly collaborated with Channel 22 of the National Council for Culture and the Arts. From 1971 to 1974 he directed the cultural supplement of the El Día newspaper, where he also authored a weekly editorial column. During 1995 he was Director General of the Mexican Institute of Cinematography.

Lozoya has held the office of Technical Secretary for Foreign Policy at the Office of the President of Mexico (1989–1991). He also served as Director General for International Relations of the Ministry of Education and Secretary General of the National Commission for the UNESCO (1977).

In the field of prospective studies, Lozoya was originally linked to the International Center for Integrative Studies (ICIS) in New York. Today he is member of the think tank COPPAN 2050 and chairman of Tonaltepec Global, an association devoted to the promotion of cultural, art and design projects.

His diplomatic career was launched by the appointment in 1969 as Honorary Consul of Mexico in Taipei, while being a student at Taiwan's National University. In 1986 he was nominated Ambassador-at-Large. In the Ministry of Foreign Affairs, Lozoya has been Director of the Mexican Institute of International Cooperation (1998–99); Executive Secretary of the Mexican Commission for the Cooperation with Central America (1998); General Director of Cultural Affairs (1993–94); Chief Director for International Cooperation (1985–88); Chief Director for Planning and Cultural Affairs (1984); Consul of Mexico in Seville, Spain on the occasion of the 1992 World Expo; and Ambassador of Mexico to Israel (1996–97) and Malaysia (2007-2012). In February 2013 Lozoya was appointed, by the Governor of Puebla, Chairman of the Fund for Cultural Promotion of that Mexican State. By April 2013 was designated Secretary of Public Education. During 2014-2016 he was Executive Secretary of the State Council of Culture and Arts of the said State of Puebla. In February 2017 he was appointed Director of the Baroque International Museum. In 2019 the University of Texas at Dallas granted him the Richard Brettell Award in the Arts; the same year he retired from public service.

Lozoya chaired the Puebla Chapter of the Mexican Academy of International Law, is a founding member of the Mexican Academy of Human Rights and has been decorated by the governments of France, Spain, Portugal, Greece, Venezuela and Argentina. Eisenhower Fellowships selected Jorge Alberto Lozoya in 1981 to represent Mexico.

== Bibliography ==
=== Books ===
- El Ejército Mexicano, México El Colegio de México, 1970, Revised edition, 1976.
- Alternative Views of the New International Economic Order, Oxford, Pergamon Press, 1979. (with Estévez, Jaime and Green, Rosario Green)
- Spanish edition:Alternativas para un nuevo orden internacional, México, Centro de Estudios Económicos y Sociales del Tercer Mundo, 1979.
- The Obstacles to the New International Economic Order, Oxford, Pergamon Press, 1980. (with László, Ervin et al.)
- Spanish edition: Obstáculos al Nuevo Orden Económico Internacional, México, Nueva Imagen, 1981.
- Latin America and the New International Economic Order, Oxford, Pergamon Press, 1980. (ed. with Estévez, Jaime)
- The Financial Issues of the New International Economic Order, Oxford, Pergamon Press, 1980. (ed. with Bhattacharya, A.K.)
- Spanish edition: Aspectos financieros del Nuevo Orden Económico Internacional, México, Nueva Imagen, 1981.
- Africa, the Middle East and New International Economic Order, Oxford, Pergamon Press, 1980. (ed. with Cuadra, Héctor)
- International Trade, Industrialization and New International Economic Order, Oxford, Pergamon Press, 1980. (ed. with Green, Rosario)
- Spanish edition: Comercio internacional, industrialización y el Nuevo Orden Económico Internacional, México, Nueva Imagen, 1983.
- Asia and the New International Economic Order, Oxford, Pergamon Press, 1981. (ed. with Bhattacharya, A.K.,)
- Social and Cultural Issues of the New International Economic Order, Oxford, Pergamon Press, 1981. (ed. with Birgin, Haydeé)
- Japón y la Cooperación Transpacífica México, El Colegio de México 1988. (editor)
- Cine mexicano, Barcelona, Lunwerg, 1993. Updated edition: 2006.
- La nueva política mexicana de cooperación internacional, México, SRE, PNUD, Instituto Mexicano de Cooperación Internacional, Miguel Ángel Porrúa, 1999.
- Balance y perspectivas de la Cooperación Iberoamericana, Madrid, Secretaría de Cooperación Iberoamericana, 2001. (editor)
- México: Juan Rulfo fotógrafo, Barcelona, Lunwerg, 2001. (et al.)
- La miel de la piedra. Reflexiones sobre la invención de Iberoamérica, Barcelona, Lunwerg, SECIB, 2003.
- El saber de la sazón: Ingenio de la gastronomía iberoamericana, Barcelona, Lunwerg, SECIB, 2004. (with López Morales, Gloria et al.)
- México visto y andado, Barcelona, Lunwerg, 2004. (with Ríos, Adalberto et al.)
- Cartas transpacíficas, México, Alianza, 2013. (with Lozoya Legorreta, Xavier)
- La globalización cultural aquí y allá, México, Selló Grulla/Grupo Coppan, 2019.

=== Academic articles ===
- "Un guión para el estudio de los ejércitos mexicanos del siglo diecinueve", Historia Mexicana, Vol. XVII, No. 4, Abr. - Jun. 1968, pp. 553–568
- "El facismo ruso en Manchuria", Estudios Orientales, Vol. III, No. 3 (8), 1968, pp. 275–294
- "La educación como clave de la industrialización: un reformador japonés (Mori) y uno mexicano (Mora)", Estudios Orientales, Vol. V, No. 3 (14), 1970, pp. 231–246
- "Educación, mestizaje y porvenir", Diálogos, Vol. VI, No. 6 (36), Nov. - Dic. 1970
- "Breve historia del ejército mexicano", in Mercier Vega, Luis (et al.) Fuerzas armadas, poder y cambio, Caracas, Tiempo Nuevo 1971, pp. 71–99
- "El tordo que costó siete vidas", (translation from the Chinese of a story by Menglung Feng), Revista de la Universidad de México, Vol. XXV, No. 7 Mar., 1971, pp. 25–31
- "Breve historia del ejército mexicano", Aportes, No. 20, Abr. 1971, pp. 113–131
- "Nixon en Peking", Estudios de Asia y África, Vol. 7, No. 1 (18), 1972, pp. 142–144
- "La TV estatal en México: notas sobre un intento", Foro Internacional Vol. XIV, No. 3, 1974 pp. 159–177
- "Para ver cine chino", Estudios Orientales, Vol. IX, Nos. 1 y 2, 1974, pp. 157–177
- "El Estatuto de la Radio y la Televisión en México", Nueva Política, Vol. I. No. 3, Jul.-Sept. 1976, pp. 209–214
- "Introducción", Catálogo de la exposición Hallazgos Arqueológicos de la República Popular China, México, Museo Nacional de Antropología, 1974, pp. 9–14
- "Hacia una política internacional en la educación y la cultura", in Continuidad y cambio en la política exterior de México: 1977. El Colegio de México, Centro de Estudios Internacionales, México, 1977, pp. 231–237
- "El intercambio educativo y cultural y el Plan Nacional de Educación de México", Diálogo América Latina y Japón, Tokio, Fundación Japón 1978, pp. 168–178
- "Many Pasts, Many Futures", Forum for Correspondence and Contact, Vol. II, No. 2, July, 1980
- "The Values of the Future and the Future of Values" Forum for Correspondence and Contact, New York, International Center for Integrative Studies, Vol. 12, Number 1, July 1980, pp. 40–42
- "Democracia, desarrollo y diálogo Norte-Sur", in Coloquio Internacional sobre el Diálogo Norte-Sur, México, Instituto de Estudios Políticos, Económicos y Sociales (IEPES del PRI) / Fundación Friedrich Ebert, 1980, pp. 18–28
- "Muchos pasados, muchos futuros", Diálogos 100, Jul. - Ago. 1981, pp. 63–64
- "A Southern View of Cancun" Background Paper for Cancun Summit, Num. 7, October 1981, Overseas Development Council, Washington, D.C.
- "El Diálogo Norte-Sur y la Diplomacia Multilateral", Foro Internacional, Vol. XXI, Abr. - Jun. 1981 No. 4, pp. 428–442
- "Ship of Diplomats", (United Nations North-South Negotiation in the Seventies), Forum for Correspondence and Contact, International Center for Integrative Studies New York Vol. 12, Number 4, July 1982, pp. 112–120
- "La Nave de los Diplomáticos", Diálogos Vol. 18, No. 5, sept.-octubre 1982, pp. 23–30.
- "Las relaciones diplomáticas de China con América Latina", Estudios de Asia y África, Vol. XVIII, Noero 1, January–March 1983, pp. 69–91. Reedited in Cornejo, Romer (coord), China:Perspectivas sobre su cultura e historia, México, El Colegio de México, 2006, pp. 285–307
- "The Pacific Basin: The Future of a Concept", in Downen Robert L. & Dickson Bruce J., The Emergency Pacific Community. A Regional Perspective. Boulder & London, Westview Press, 1984, pp. 45–55
- "México y la diplomacia multilateral", Foro Internacional, Vol. 24, No. 4 (96), Abr. - Jun. 1984, pp. 427 – 442
- "Silvio Zavala Subversivo", Diálogos, Vol. 20, No. 3, May. -Jun. 1984, pp. 67–69
- "México y el Multilateralismo", in Política Exterior de México: 175 años de Historia, México, Secretaría de Relaciones Exteriores, 1985, Vol. III, pp. 416.-442.
- "La cultura y los derechos humanos", Revista Mexicana de Política Exterior, Instituto Matías Romero de Estudios Diplomáticos, No. 8, Jul. - Sept. 1985, pp. 13–15
- "México, la paz y la cultura", in México y la paz. México, Instituto Matías Romero de Estudios Diplomáticos, Secretaría de Relaciones Exteriores, 1986, pp. 169–161
- "La cultura y la UNESCO: una perspectiva mexicana", in México en la UNESCO: En el umbral del siglo XXI, México, SEP/CONALMEX, 1986 pp. 65–71
- "Una reflexión sobre los instrumentos y mecanismos de la política exterior", Foro Internacional, No. 107, Vol. XXVII, Ene. - Mar. 1987, No. 3, pp. 419–422
- "Culture, Freedom and Change", in Blaser, Robin & Dunham, Roberth (eds), Art and Reality, a Casebook of Concern, Vancouver, Talonbooks, 1986, pp. 205–216
- "Identidad y modernidad", Revista Mexicana de Política Exterior, No. 16, Jul.-Sept. 1987, pp. 17–18
- "Cultura y comunicación", in II Foro Internacional de Comunicación, México, El Día en libros, 1988, pp. 17–18
- "Una cultura para el cambio", Examen, 1988, año I, No. 2, pp. 16–17
- "La coordinación interna de las estrategias internacionales", in Green, Rosario (ed), México y sus Estrategias Internacionales, México, Diana, 1989. pp. 319–323
- "Los partidos políticos de América Latina en el actual escenario internacional", in Green, Rosario (ed), Democracia y recuperación económica en América Latina, México, El Día en libros, 1990, pp. 501–504
- "Japón 1946-1990: el camino a la opulencia"; México, Instituto Matías Romero de Estudios Diplomáticos. (Cuaderno de política internacional, 51), 1990. (with Kerber, Víctor)
- "A Reference Memorandum on the New International Economic Order and The North-South Dialogue" in Martínez Legorreta, Omar (ed), Relations between Mexico and Canada, Mexico, El Colegio de Mexico, 1990, pp. 285–290
- "La Cuenca del Pacífico: retos y oportunidades para México", in Roett, Riordan (ed), Relaciones Exteriores de México en la Década de los Noventa, México, Siglo XXI, 1990 pp. 165–171
- "México and the Pacific Rim: Towards Foreign and Domestic Policy Agenda", in Roett, Riordan (ed), Mexico External Relations in the 1990s, Boulder, Lynne Rienner Publishers, 1991, pp. 123–128
- "La Cuenca del Pacífico en la estrategia de simultaneidad de la política exterior de México", in El papel de México en el mundo, México, Comisión de Relaciones Exteriores de la Cámara de Diputados, LIV Legislatura, 1991, pp. 83–86
- "El Japón contemporáneo: de la devastación a la opulencia", in Martínez Legorreta, Omar (ed) Japón: Su tierra e historia, México, El Colegio de México, 1991, pp. 243–302. (with Kerber, Víctor)
- "Soberanía y cultura", Plural, Oct. 1993, pp. 20–22
- "El entorno de la política exterior de México" in Democracia mexicana, México. H. Cámara de Diputados, LV Legislatura, Instituto de Investigaciones Legislativas, 1994, pp. 451–454
- "La cooperación cultural y la política exterior de México" in La política internacional de México en el decenio de los ochentas, México, Fondo de Cultura Económica, 1994, pp. 469–490
- "México y la cooperación internacional" in Revista Mexicana de Política Exterior, Otoño 1994, pp. 131–140
- "Yo en San Ildefonso", in Garzón, Luis Eduardo, La historia y la piedra. El antiguo Colegio de San Ildefonso, México, Miguel Angel Porrúa, 2000, pp. 363–368
- "La nueva política de cooperación internacional de México", Foro Internacional, Vol. XLI. No. 4, Oct.-Dic. 2001. pp. 931–938
- "La nueva política de cooperación internacional de México" in Garza Elizondo, Humberto (ed) Entre la globalización y la dependencia: La política exterior de México, 1994-2000, México. El Colegio de México, 2002, pp 339–346
- "El mundo al inicio del siglo XXI: un panorama político", in Herrera-Lasso, Luis (coord.), México ante el mundo: tiempo de definiciones, México, Fondo de Cultura Económica, 2006, pp. 117–154
- "La cooperación cultural y la crisis global" in Cruz, Eduardo (coord.), Diplomacia y cooperación cultural de México: una aproximación, Tuxtla Gutiérrez, Universidad de Ciencias y Artes de Chiapas / Universidad Autónoma de Nuevo León, 2007, pp. 83–90
- "México y la nueva geopolítica mundial", in Arturo C. Sotomayor, Arturo & Vega, Gustavo (coords.), El mundo desde México. Ensayos de política internacional. Homenaje a Olga Pellicer, El Colegio de México / Instituto Tecnológico Autónomo de México / Centro de Investigación y Docencia Económicas, 2008, pp. 17–23
- "Cooperación y diplomacia cultural: experiencias y travesías", in César Villanueva, Entrevista a Jorge Alberto Lozoya, Revista Mexicana de Politica Exterior, No. 85, February 2009, pp. 253–267
- "Prólogo", in Ruiz Sandoval, Erika (ed.), México 2010. Hipotecando el futuro, México, Taurus, 2010, pp. 13–25
- "Asia Pacífico en la mira", in Torres, Blanca & Vega, Gustavo (coords.), Los grandes problemas de México, XII. Relaciones Internacionales, México, El Colegio de México, 2010, pp. 530–555.
- "México en 2010", en México y el mundo : 2010, reflexiones desde El Colegio de México. Memoria del coloquio: estudiantes de las licenciaturas en Relaciones Internacionales y Política y Administración Pública Generación 2006-2010. El Colegio de México, México, 2010, pp. 225–228
- "México ante el resurgimiento de Asia Pacífico", in González, Guadalupe/ Pellicer, Olga (coords.), Los retos internacionales de México. Urgencia de una mirada nueva, México, Siglo XXI, 2011, pp. 129–144.
- "Japón contemporáneo" with Kerber, Víctor in Tanaka Michiko, Historia mínima de Japón, México, El Colegio de México, 2011, pp. 287–347.
- "Asia en la mira", in Ordorica, Manuel/ Prud'homme, Jean-Francois, Los grandes problemas de México. Edición abreviada, IV Política, México, El Colegio de México, 2012, pp. 80–83.
- "De Kuala Lumpur a Buenos Aires, sin escalas", in Equipo Latinoamericano de Justicia y Género, Autonomía y feminismo siglo XXI. Escritos en homenaje a Haydée Birgin, Buenos Aires, Biblos, 2012, pp. 135–138
- "México en las batallas de las cocinas nacionales", in Elogio de la cocina mexicana. Patrimonio cultural de la humanidad, México, Artes de México, Conservatorio de la Cultura Mexicana, 2012, pp. 43–47
- "Mexico, Latin America and Asia Pacific; Enhancing Strategic Cooperation", in Nathan, K. S. & Rashila Ramli, Strehgthening Partnership and Cooperation Between the Occident and Asia, Bangi, Malaysia : Penerbit Universiti Kebangsaan Malaysia, 2013, pp. 67–72.
- "Los desvelos de un abuelo", in Ortiz Ortiz, María Salvadora (coord.), Iberoamérica hoy: perspectivas de las relaciones iberoamericanas, Extremadura, Centro Extremeño de Estudios y Cooperación iberoamericana (CEXECI), 2013, pp. 83–88.
- "El Ejército Mexicano y el escenario internacional", in Historia de los ejércitos mexicanos, México, Secretaría de la Defensa Nacional / Secretaría de Educación Pública / Instituto Nacional de Estudios Históricos de las Revoluciones de México, 2013, pp. 641–646.
- "Avatares de la cooperación internacional", in Villanueva, César, Una nueva diplomacia cultural para México. Theoría, praxis y techné, México, Universidad Iberoamericana, 2015, pp. 85–96.
- "La cultura mexicana y la globalización", in Ordorica, Guillermo (coord.), México Siglo XXI. 85 años de trabajo para el engrandecimiento de la Nación, vol. V, Educación, ciencia y cultura, México, Partido Revolucionario Institucional, 2015, pp. 43–48.
- "México y las operaciones de mantenimiento de la paz", with Fierro, Amaury in González, Guadalupe, Pellicer, Olga & Saltalamacchia, Natalia (coords), México y el multilateralismo del siglo XXI, México, Siglo XXI/ Senado de la República/ ITAM, 2015, pp. 76–95.
