= Bruno Figueroa Fischer =

Mexican diplomat

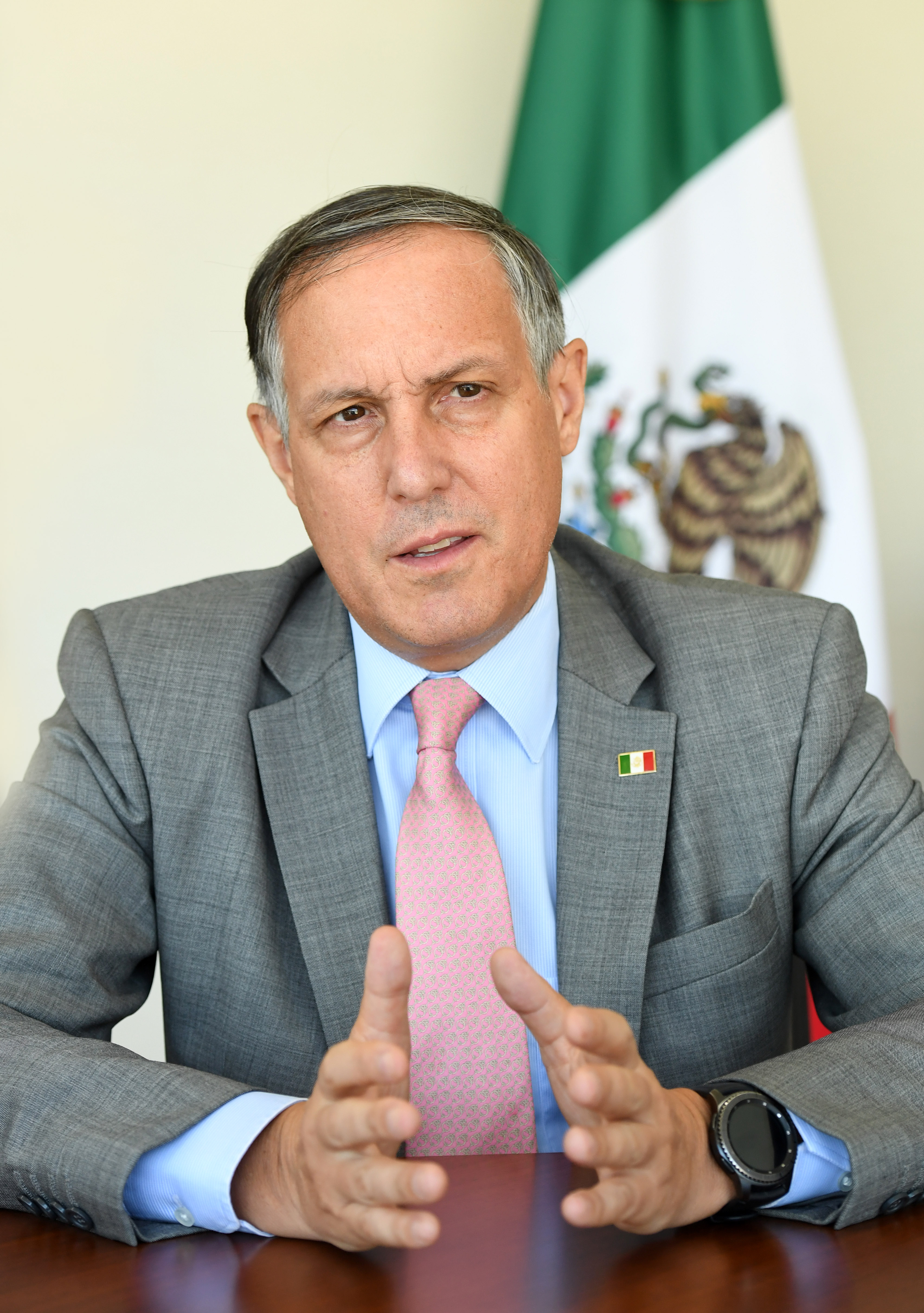
- Born: October 24, 1965 (age 61); Mexico City
- Education: El Colegio de Mexico National School of Administration of France
- Awards: French Legion of Honor in the grade of Commander; Honoris Causa Doctorate in International Relations by Shinhan University (Republic of Korea); Honorary Citizen of Seoul
- Scientific career
- Fields: Diplomat

Bruno Figueroa Fischer is a Mexican diplomat. He is currently Ambassador to the Portuguese Republic since December 22, 2022. He was also Ambassador to the Republic of Korea (concurrently to the Democratic People's Republic of Korea and to Mongolia) between 2017 and 2022. In his previous positions, he was Director General of the Mesoamerica Integration and Development Project (known as the Mesoamerica Project) at the Mexican Agency for International Development Cooperation (Amexcid) at the Secretariat of Foreign Affairs of Mexico (Secretaría de Relaciones Exteriores) between 2015 and 2017.

== Education ==
He holds a degree in international relations from El Colegio de Mexico, and has an MBA from the National School of Administration of France (ENA). He also studied at the Matias Romero Institute (Instituto Matías Romero), and has diplomas from the Diplomatic Academy of Vienna and The Hague Academy of International Law.

== Diplomatic career ==
Ambassador Bruno Figueroa is a career diplomat since 1987. In his last posts abroad, he served as Deputy Permanent Representative to the Organization for Economic Cooperation and Development, OECD, (2007–2010), and as Consul General of Mexico in San Jose, California (2004–2007). In Mexico, he served as Director General of the Mesoamerica Integration and Development Project (2015–2017), being in charge of the technical, scientific and financial cooperation between Mexico and Central America and the Caribbean; Director General for Technical and Scientific Cooperation (2013–2015); Chief of Staff of both the Mexican Agency for International Development Cooperation (2011–2013) and the Unit for Economic Relations and International Cooperation (2010–2011). He was also Advisor to the Secretary of Foreign Affairs (2001–2004).

While in post in the Republic of Korea, he conceived and coordinated the construction of the Mexican Garden at the Suncheonman Bay National Garden (순천만국가정원). This garden is the only public space in Korea with the name of Mexico. The designers were Jun Hyung-Soon and Choi Jung-Min, professors at Suncheon National University.

In 2019, he started a research project about the participation of Mexican and Mexican-American soldiers in the Korean War in order to recover historical memory of this event and to honor the Mexican survivors of this conflict. On April 24, 2021, the first association of Mexican Veterans of the Korean War was established. From June–September 2022, the exhibition "Mexicans and Mexican-Americans: the forgotten soldiers of the Korean War" took place at the Korean War Memorial Museum.

He won the 2019 Public Diplomacy Ambassador Award by the JoongAng Daily and the Corps of Honorary Consuls in Korea, with the project "Xico in Korea". He received an Honoris Causa Doctorate in International Relations by Shinhan University (Republic of Korea) on October 11, 2022, and he was named an Honorary Citizen of Seoul by Mayor Oh Se-hoon on November 9 of the same year.

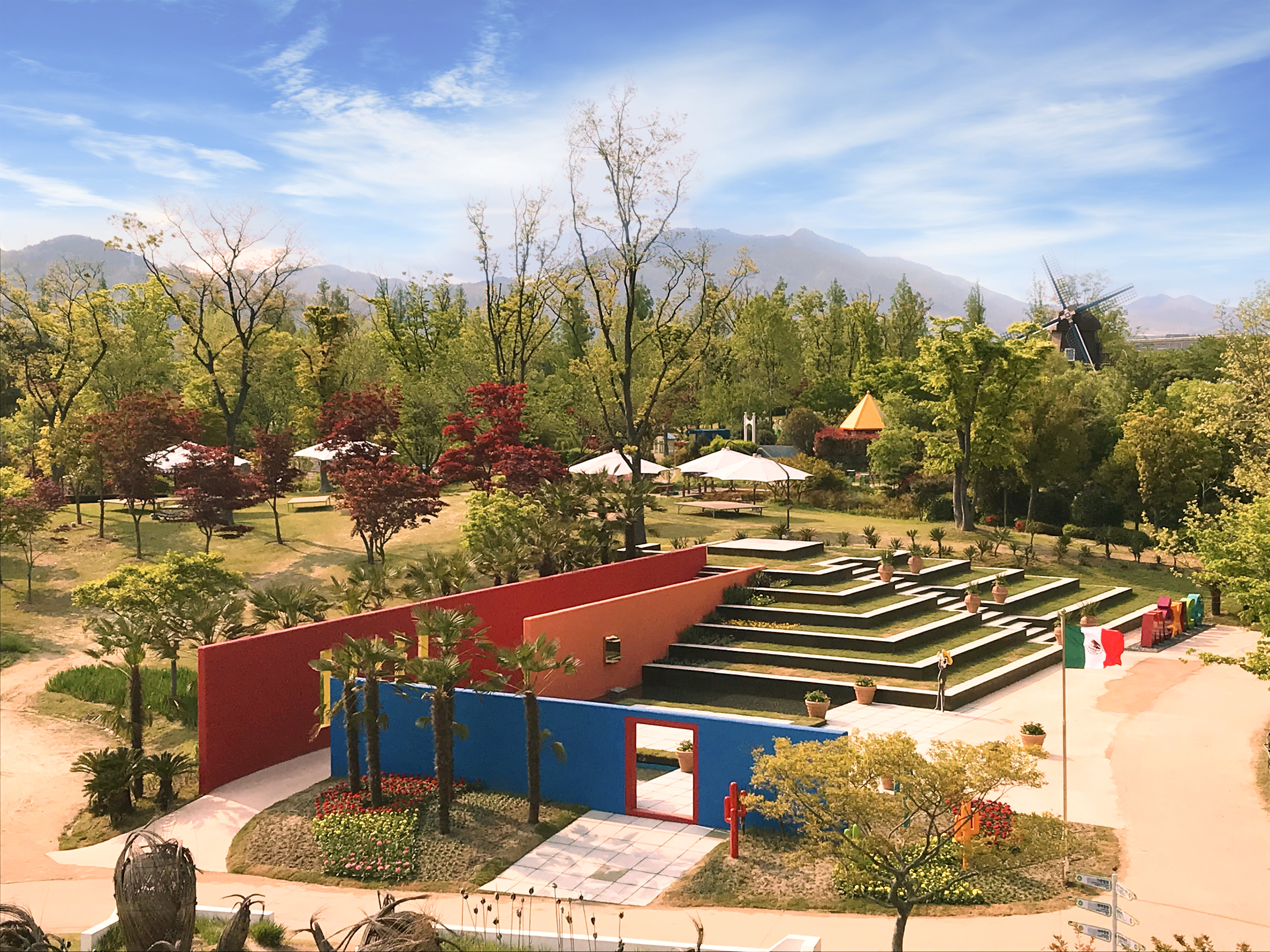
Mexican Garden at the Suncheonman Bay National Garden

== Academic activities and publications ==
He has taught courses and given lectures at El Colegio Nacional and several institutions of higher education in Mexico such as UAM, ITAM, CIDE, El Colegio de Mexico and Universidad Iberoamericana.

He has coordinated specialized publications and is the author of several books and articles on international affairs. He received the Genaro Estrada recognition for his work published in 2016 by the Matias Romero Institute and the Historical Diplomatic Archives of the Secretariat of Foreign Affairs of Mexico: Cien años de cooperación internacional de México, 1900–2000. Solidaridad, intereses y geopolítica [One Hundred Years of International Mexican Cooperation (1900–2000): solidarity, interests and geopolitics].

He was President of the Mexican Association of the National School of Administration of France (ENA) Alumni from 2010 to 2017, and is a member of the Mexican Council of International Affairs (COMEXI). He was appointed in 2026 as an honorary member of the Spanish Academy of Diplomacy. He is a recipient of the French Legion of Honor in the grade of Commander.

In 2020, he published the political fable "La guerra de los nopales" in the Acentos Review magazine and "The Nopales War," its English version, at the Angel City Review magazine.

== Publications ==
- "La diplomacia hoy: condena y redención", Otros diálogos de El Colegio de México, 2026, num. 35.
- Mário Soares e a América Latina. Passado, Presente e Futuro (co-coordination with Ana Paula Laborinho et al.), Lisbon, Universidade Autónoma de Lisboa e Observare, 2026.
- "México-Portugal: A história dos caminhos cruzados e das relações em expansão", Revista Negócios Estrangeiros, 2025.
- Figueroa, Bruno y Bracho, Gerardo, "Las perspectivas de la cooperación mexicana a 2030 y más allá: ¿espacio para el optimismo?" in Citlali Ayala Martínez, Jorge A. Pérez-Pineada and Sergio Vázquez Meneley (coords.), Evolución, balance y prospectiva de la cooperación internacional para el desarrollo. Visión mexicana de la política, la vinculación interinstitucional y la gestión, Mexico, Instituto de Investigaciones Dr. José María Luis Mora, 2025.
- Remund, Mariella C., Figueroa, Bruno and Ortega, Jorge, Un mar compartido; diálogo entre México y Portugal / Um mar partilhado; diálogo entre México e Portugal, Mexicali, Cetys Universidad, 2025.
- "Tras las elusivas huellas de México en Portugal", in Mariella C. Remund, Bruno Figueroa and Jorge Ortega (coord.), Un mar compartido; diálogo entre México y Portugal / Um mar partilhado; diálogo entre México e Portugal, Mexicali, Cetys Universidad, 2025, pp. 19-40.
- "México y Portugal, fascinaciones mutuas", in Rafael Toriz (coord.), Estela de un mar en llamas, Mexico, Vanilla Planifolia, 2024.
- "Capacidades institucionales, recursos humanos y financieros para una política exterior renovada (2024-2030)" in Rafael Velázquez Flores, Jorge A. Schiavon and Adriana Sletza Ortega Ramírez (eds.), La política exterior de México 2024-2030: Diagnóstico y propuestas, Mexico, AMEI/IBERO-CDMX/CESPEM, 2024 (co-authorship with Jorge Schiavon).
- "Huérfanos de la historia: los veteranos mexicanos de la Guerra de Corea", Otros diálogos de El Colegio de México, 2023, number 22.
- "Corea del Sur y México. Excepcionalidad y asimetría a 60 años del establecimiento de relaciones diplomáticas", Foreign Affairs Latinoamérica, February 10, 2022.
- “The Impact of Globalisation and Neoliberal Structural Reforms on the Mexican Ministry of Foreign Affairs,” in Christian Lequesne (ed.) Ministries of Foreign Affairs in the World: Actors of State Diplomacy, Leiden, Boston, Brill/Nijhoff, 2022 (co-authorship with Jorge Schiavon).
- "México y Corea: los lazos inquebrantables de una relación diplomática que cumple 60 años," in Ministerio de Relaciones Exteriores de la República de Corea and Consejo Coreano para América Latina y el Caribe (eds.), Corea-América Latina. 60 años de amistad, Seoul, Ministry of Foreign Affairs of the Republic of Korea, 2022.
- ‘한국과 멕시코 수교 60주년을 맞이하여 돌아보는 견고한 유대 관계’, in Ministerio de Relaciones Exteriores de la República de Corea and Consejo Coreano para América Latina y el Caribe (eds.), 한-중남미, 우정 60년, Ministry of Foreign Affairs of the Republic of Korea, 2022.
- “México y Corea: 60 años de fecundas relaciones,” in 60º aniversario de las relaciones Corea-México; evaluación y objetivos futuros, Embassy of the Republic of Korea in Mexico, 2021.
- ‘멕시코-한국 관계: 생산적 관계의 60년사’, en 한국-멕시코 수교 60주년: 평가와 미래 과제, Mexico, Embassy of the Republic of Korea in Mexico, 2021.
- "México y Corea del Sur en 2020: de las relaciones oficiales y empresariales a la hora de los ciudadanos," in Nayelli López (coord.), Península coreana: estrategias, reestructuración e inserción en el mundo global, México, UNAM, 2020.
- "La cooperación mexicana en la encrucijada: el difícil camino hacia la AMEXCID," Revista Española de Desarrollo y Cooperación, 2021, number 47, pp. 75–86 (co-authorship with Gerardo Bracho Carpizo).
- "The Nopales War," Angel City Review, August 2020.
- “La guerra de los nopales,” The Acentos Review, February 2020.
- "Los recursos y las capacidades de la política exterior de México (2012-2020)," in Ana Covarrubias Velasco et al. (eds.), Fundamentos internos y externos de la política exterior de México (2012-2018), Mexico, El Colegio de México/CIDE, 2020 (co-authorship with Jorge Schiavon).
- "Foreign Policy Capacities, State Foreign Services, and International Influence: Brazil versus Mexico," Diplomacy & Statecraft, 4(2019), pp. 816–828 (co-authorship with Jorge Schiavon).
- "Los recursos y capacidades de la política exterior de México (2012-2018)," Foro Internacional, 3-4(2019), pp. 609–642 (co-authorship with Jorge Schiavon).
- "La paradoja mexicana. Un país abierto al mundo con limitadas capacidades diplomáticas," Foreign Affairs Latinoamérica, 2019, number 1, pp. 93–102 (co-authorship with Jorge Schiavon).
- "Las capacidades de la política exterior de México: diagnóstico (2000-18) y propuestas (2018-24)," in Jorge A. Schiavon, Rafael Velázquez Flores and Humberto Garza Elizondo (eds.), La política exterior de México 2018-2024: diagnóstico y propuestas, Mexico, CIDE, UABC, UANL, 2018 (co-authorship with Jorge Schiavon).
- El principio de la cooperación internacional para el desarrollo, Mexico, Secretaría de Relaciones Exteriores/Acervo Histórico Diplomático, 2017, 117 pp. (co-authorship with María Eugenia Casar).
- Cien años de cooperación internacional de México, 1900–2000. Solidaridad, intereses y geopolítica, Mexico, Secretaría de Relaciones Exteriores/Instituto Matías Romero/Acervo Histórico Diplomático, 2016, 545 pp.
- "Asilo y asistencia a refugiados guatemaltecos en el Sur-Sureste de México (1980–2000): Solidaridad interna y movilización internacional," in Irina Mosel, Christina Bennett y Hanna Krebs (editors), Aproximaciones a la historia del humanitarismo en América Latina y el Caribe, London, Humanitarian Policy Group, Overseas Development Institute, 2016.
- "Brasil y México: inversión y capacidades en política exterior," Foreign Policy en español, 2014, number 16 (co-authorship with Jorge Schiavon).
- Revista Mexicana de Política Exterior: México y la cooperación internacional para el desarrollo, 2014, number 102 (co-coordination with Noel González Segura).
- "Breve historia de la cooperación internacional de México (1900-2000)," Revista Mexicana de Política Exterior, 2014, number 102 (special number).
- L’ENA hors les murs: La mano en la mano; 1964-2014, l’épanouissement des relations France-Mexique, April 2014 (coordinator).
- Cuadernos de política internacional: Quince años de México en la OCDE, 2009 (coordinator).
- "La OCDE, ejemplo de multilateralismo eficaz: orígenes, estructura, instrumentos jurídicos y ámbitos de acción," Cuadernos de política internacional: Quince años de México en la OCDE, 2009.
- "Imagen de México en la prensa francesa, 1994-1998," Revista Mexicana de Política Exterior, 1999, number 58.
- "L’image du Mexique dans les médias français (1994 – 1997): plus d’information, moins de clichés ?", Cahiers des Amériques Latines, 1998, number 28/29.
