= Instituto Nacional de Estudios Históricos de la Revolución Mexicana =

Mexican research institute

Coordinates: 19.360775°N 99.182732°W

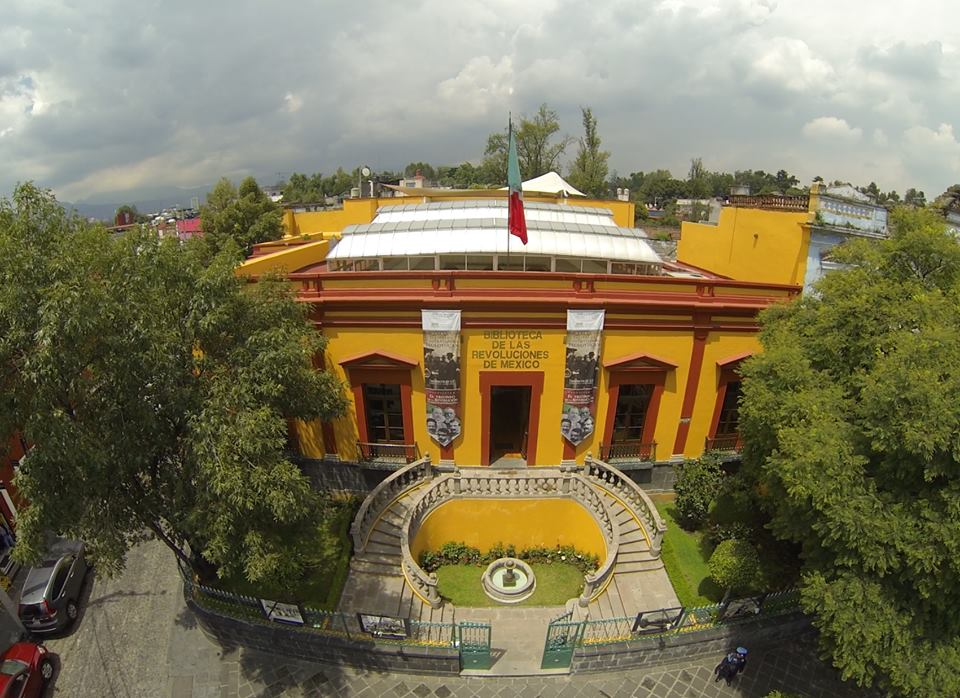
INEHRM's building in San Ángel, Mexico City

The Instituto Nacional de Estudios Históricos de las Revoluciones de México (English: National Institute of Historical Studies on Mexico's Revolutions; INEHRM) is a research institute of the federal Secretariat of Public Education (Spanish: Secretaría de Educación Pública), dedicated to studying the Mexican Revolution (1910–1920).

It was founded in 1953 as the Instituto Nacional de Estudios Históricos de la Revolución Mexicana (English: National Institute of Historical Studies on the Mexican Revolution) and acquired its current name in 2006.

Pedro Salmerón Sanginés, director-general of the institute from 2013, resigned on 21 September 2019, citing right-wing opposition. He was replaced by Felipe Arturo Ávila Espinosa, who has a bachelor's degree in sociology from the Universidad Nacional Autónoma de México and a doctorate in history from the Colegio de México.
