= Javier Treviño =

Mexican politician

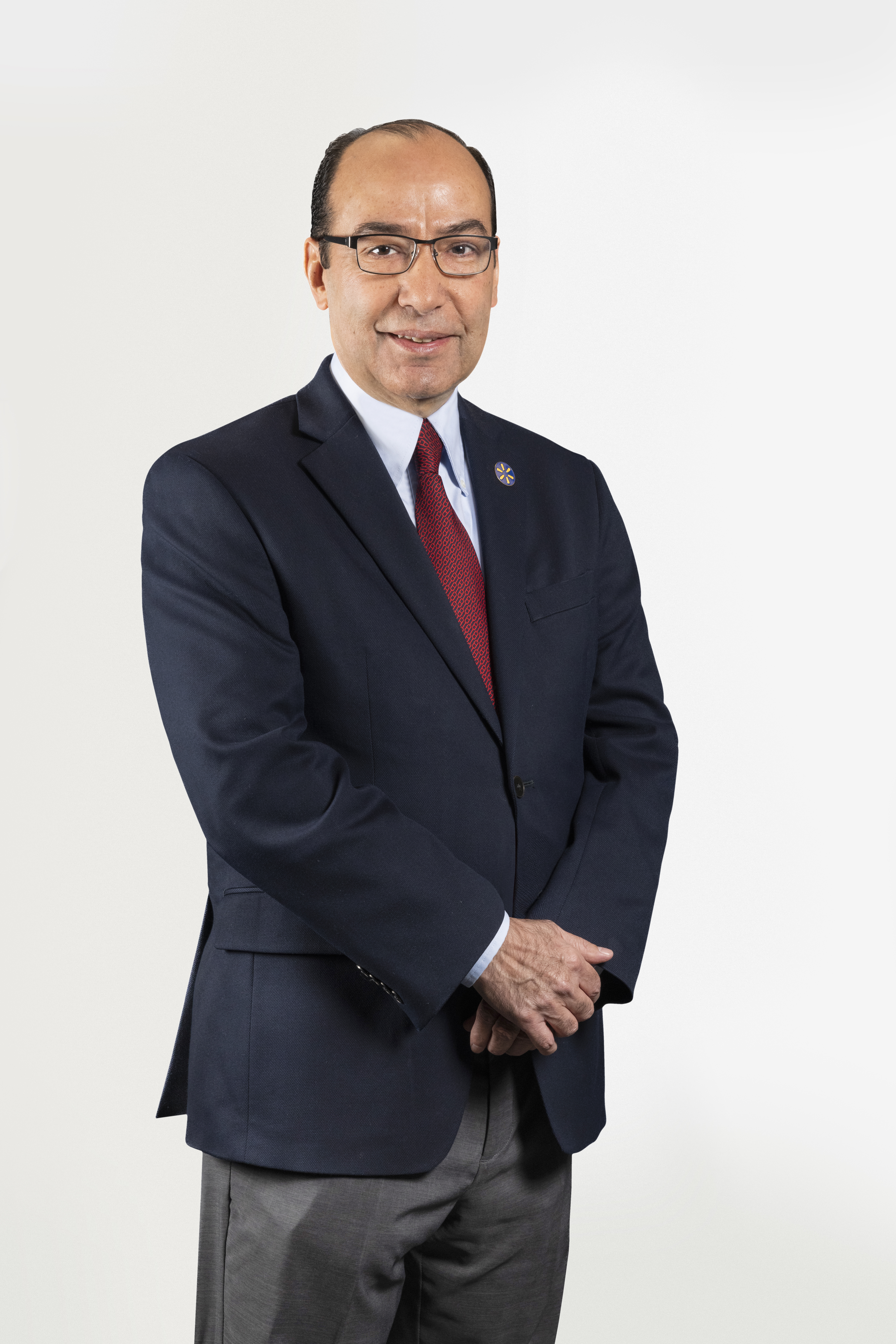
Treviño Cantú in 2023

Javier Treviño Cantú (born 11 December 1960) is the senior vice president for corporate affairs of Walmart of Mexico and Central America. He served as the CEO of Mexico's Business Council (CCE). Treviño Cantú was appointed Mexico's deputy secretary of education by President Enrique Peña Nieto on 20 November 2014. He was elected to the Chamber of Deputies in 2012.

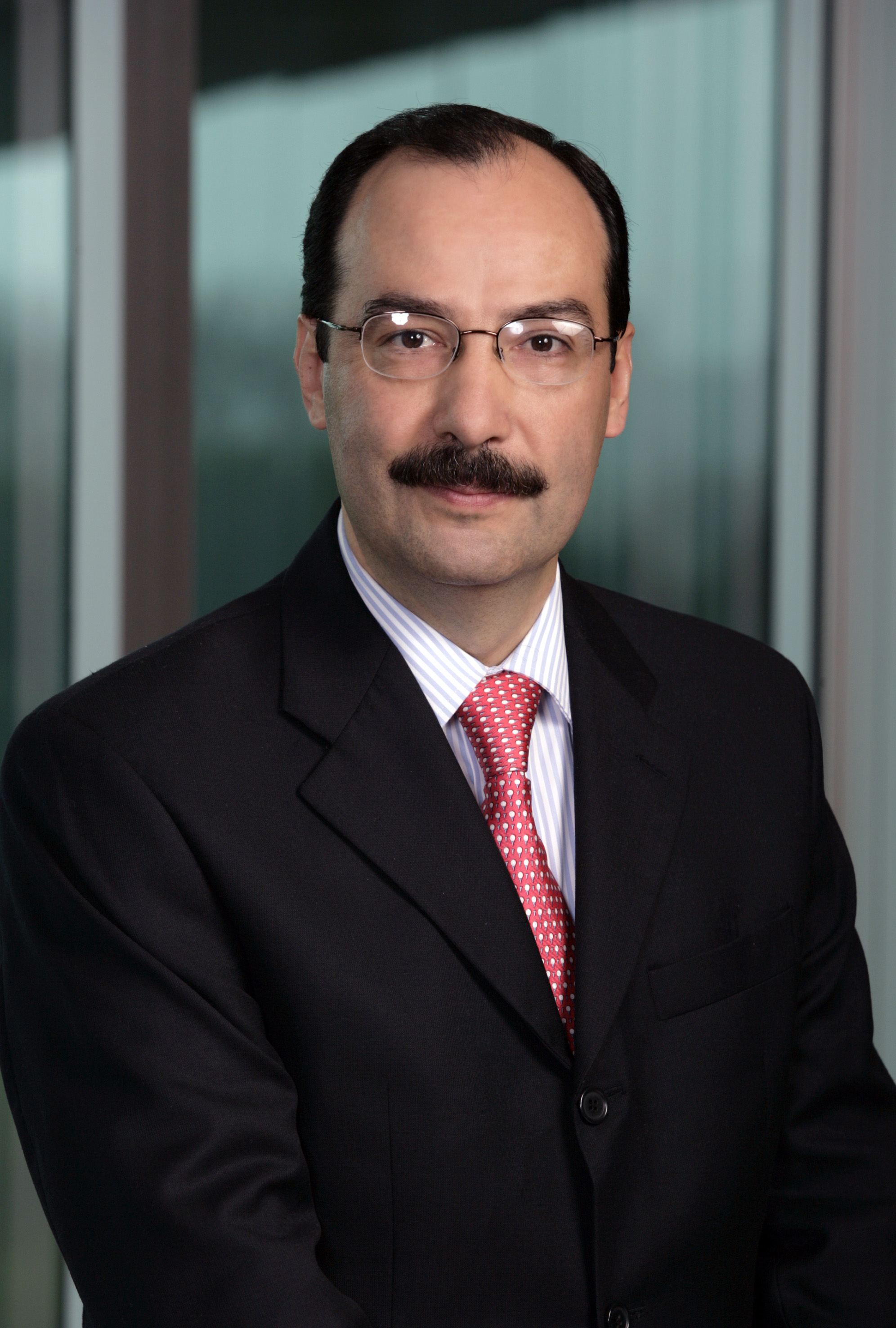
Treviño Cantú in 2007

Treviño Cantú has 14 years of experience in corporate roles and 16 years in government, with involvement in political, communication, and international affairs.

Treviño Cantú was a member of Mexico's Congress of the Union as a federal deputy for the state of Nuevo León for the Institutional Revolutionary Party (PRI). He served as secretary of the Energy and Finance Committees and was a member of the Migration Affairs Committee and the Special Committee on Information and Communication Technologies.

Treviño Cantú served as secretary of the interior of the Mexican state of Nuevo León from October 2009 to February 2012. As cabinet chief, he coordinated all government efforts in one of the most important states of Mexico. He was the general coordinator for the transition team of Nuevo León's governor-elect in 2009 and the presidential campaign manager for Enrique Peña Nieto in the state of Nuevo León.

Treviño Cantú was the senior vice president of corporate communications and public affairs at Cemex, the global building materials company, from March 2001 to September 2009. He coordinated Cemex's external and internal global communication and external relations. He was responsible for corporate media relations, strategic issue and coverage monitoring, corporate identity, brand communication strategy, public affairs, and corporate social responsibility strategies. With a staff of well-trained professionals, Treviño Cantú coordinated company communication offices worldwide to develop and implement message initiatives and comprehensive communication and public affairs strategies.

Treviño Cantú began his public service career in 1987 as planning director in Mexico's Secretariat of Public Education. He later worked as a special adviser to the press secretary for the president of Mexico.

From 1989 to 1993, Treviño Cantú was posted to the Mexican embassy in Washington, D.C., where he served as spokesman and minister for press and public affairs during the negotiations that led to the North American Free Trade Agreement.

In early 1993, Treviño Cantú became a close adviser to then-Secretary of Social Development Luis Donaldo Colosio and joined Colosio's presidential campaign team later that year as strategy adviser and speechwriter. In April 1994, Treviño Cantú was appointed senior adviser on international relations in Ernesto Zedillo's successful presidential campaign.

Treviño Cantú served in top posts in the Zedillo administration, including three years as deputy foreign minister and two years as deputy finance minister for administration.

He is a frequent collaborator of national newspapers, including Milenio Diario, Reforma, and SDPNoticias, where he writes about Mexican politics and international affairs, and a commentator on television and radio shows. He has served as vice president of the Mexican Council on Foreign Relations (COMEXI). He has been a member of the board of the Institute of the Americas, the Woodrow Wilson International Center for Scholars's Mexico Institute, the Organization of American States's Trust for the Americas, the North American Center at Arizona State University, the Center for U.S.-Mexican Studies at the University of California, San Diego and the Trust of El Colegio de México, a leading Mexican university and think tank.

Treviño Cantú holds a B.A. in International Relations from El Colegio de México and a Master's in Public Policy degree from Harvard University's John F. Kennedy School of Government.
