= Carlos Marichal =

Mexican economic historian (Harvard alumni)

- Awards: Premio Jaume Vicens Vives, Alice Hanson Jones Prize

Academic background
- Education: Harvard University (Ph.D.), 1977

Academic work
- Discipline: Economic History
- Institutions: El Colegio de México

Carlos Marichal is a Mexican economic historian who currently works at El Colegio de México, where he has taught since 1989. He has done research and published widely on the economic and financial history of Latin America.

== Life and career ==
He received his Ph.D. in history from Harvard University (1977) and has been visiting professor at Stanford University (1998-1999), Universidad Carlos III de Madrid (1996), École des hautes études en sciences sociales (1994), Universidad Autónoma de Barcelona (1990, 1993 and 2009) and Universidad Complutense de Madrid (1987).

His best known work is the book A Century of Debt Crises in Latin America: From Independence to the Great Depression, 1820-1930 (Princeton University Press, 1989). Barry Eichengreen wrote about Marichal's book as follows:

This book can be heartily recommended… Carlos Marichal provides a compelling account of a century of Latin American international financial relations. He argues that the sequence of debt crisis that has punctuated Latin American history is attributable to cyclical instability in the creditor countries. Periods of buoyant growth and rapidly expanding international trade in the north have provoked surges in lending to the south, as the pool of funds made available in the financial centres grows even more rapidly than the needs of the industrial countries and as the capital markets succumb to frenzied speculation. Ultimately, overextended investors are forced to retrench, provoking a cyclical downturn in the north and, with the simultaneous contraction of trade and lending, a debt crisis in the south.

He is also the author of Bankruptcy of Empire: Mexican Silver and the Wars Between Spain, Britain, and France (Cambridge University Press, 2007). In September 2008, this work received the Alice Hanson Jones Biennial Prize of the Economic History Association of the United States, as “Outstanding Book on North American Economic History”. Almost a year later in August 2009, the same work was awarded the Jaume Vicens Vives Prize of the Spanish Economic History Association, being judged the best book published on the economic history of Spain and Latin America in the biennial period of 2007–2008. His more recently book publication is Nueva historia de las grandes crisis financieras, 1873-2008 (Random House Mondadori, 2010). He is also the editor of a dozen collective monographs on the economic history of Latin America, including studies on banking and fiscal history as well as a number of joint studies on history of enterprise in Mexico in the nineteenth and twentieth centuries.

He is founder and past president of the Mexican Economic History Association (2001-2004), and has served as member of the executive committee of the International Economic History Association from 2000 to 2008. He received a Guggenheim fellowship in 1994-1995 and a Tinker Fellowship in 1997/98, as well other awards. He is also member of the academic boards of ten international journals on economic history and Latin American history, he is member of the Mexican Sistema Nacional de Investigadores, at the highest level. From 2003 until 2008 he was a member of the Board of Governors of El Colegio de México.

== Books ==
As author

- Nueva Historia de las Grandes Crisis Financieras (Random House Mondadori, 2010) ISBN 978-607-310-142-4.
- Bankruptcy of Empire: Mexican Silver and the Wars Between Spain, Britain and France, 1760-1810 (Cambridge University Press, 2007) ISBN 0521792789.
- La Bancarrota del Virreinato: 1780-1810: La Nueva España y las Finanzas del Imperio Español. (Fondo de Cultura Económica, 1999) ISBN 968-16-5675-X.
- El primer siglo de la hacienda pública del Estado de México, 1824-1923. with Manuel Miño and Paolo Riguzzi (El Colegio Mexiquense, 1994) ISBN 9686873236.
- A Century of Debt Crises in Latin America: From Independence to the Great Depression, 1820-1930 (Princeton University Press, 1989) ISBN 0691077924.
- Historia de la Deuda Externa de América Latina (Alianza Editorial, 1989) ISBN 9686001964.
- La Revolución Liberal y los Primeros partidos políticos en España, 1834-1844 (Cátedra, 1980) ISBN 8437602459.
- Spain, A New Society, 1834-1844 (Tamesis, 1977) ISBN 84-3997339-X.

As editor

- Pensar el Antimperialismo: Ensayos sobre Historia Intelectual de América Latina. ed. with Alexandra Pita. (El Colegio de México/ Universidad de Colima, 2012).
- El secreto del imperio: los situados coloniales en el siglo XVIIIed. with Johanna von Grafenstein.(El Colegio de México / Instituto Mora, 2012).
- La banque francaise en Amérique Latine with Albert Broder. (Maison des Sciences de l´Homme, 2010).
- Latinoamérica y España, 1800-1850. Un crecimiento económico nada excepcional ed. with Enrique Llopis. (Marcial Pons-Instituto Mora, 2009)
- Crear la nación, los nombres de los países de América Latina ed. with José Carlos Chiaramonte and Aimer Granados.(Sudamericana, 2008).
- Crónica Gráfica de los Impuestos en México, Siglos XVI-XX(Secretaría de Hacienda y Crédito Público, 2003)
- La Banca Regional en México 1870-1930 ed. with Mario Cerutti. (Fondo de Cultura Económica / El Colegio de México, 2003)
- La banca en México, 1820-1920, ed. with Leonor Ludlow. (nstituto Mora / El Colegio de México / Universidad Nacional Autónoma de México-Instituto de Investigaciones Históricas / El Colegio de Michoacán, 1998).
- Un siglo de deuda pública en México ed. with Leonor Ludlow (El Colegio de México, 1998).
- Foreign Investment in Latin America: Impact on Economic Development, 1850-1930 (Universitá Bocconi, 1996).
- Las inversiones extranjeras en América Latina, 1850-1930: nuevos debates y problemas en historia económica comparada (El Colegio de México / Fideicomiso Historia de las Américas / Fondo de Cultura Económica, 1995.)
- La formación de la banca central en España y América Latina ed. with Pedro Tedde. (Banco de España, 1994).
- Banca y Poder en México, 1880-1925ed. with Leonor Ludlow (Grijalbo, 1986).
