= Brígida García Guzmán =

Mexican sociologist and demographer (1947–2020)

Brígida García Guzmán (May 13, 1947 – 18 September 2020) was a sociologist and demographer. She was born in Moca in the Dominican Republic in 1947. In 1969, she moved to Mexico to pursue studies in demographics at The College of Mexico. She later obtained her doctorate in sociology at the School of Political and Social Sciences at the National Autonomous University of Mexico. She became a Mexican citizen in 1991.

García Guzmán was a professor and investigator at the Center of Demographic, Urban, and Environmental studies at El Colegio de México, until she gained emeritus status in 2019. She formed part of the National System of Investigators, specializing in labor market, family, and gender studies.

García Guzmán received recognition for her contributions to constructing indicators and lines of action regarding poverty, heads of family, intrafamilial violence, and the female labor force. In 2003, she received the Luisa María Leal Duk Award of Population, awarded by her National Forum of Women and Population Politics for her contributions regarding the significance of working women.
