= Víctor Urquidi =

Mexican civil servant, economist and academic

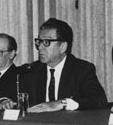
Victor Urquidi, 1984

Víctor Luis Urquidi Bingham (3 May 1919 – 23 August 2004) was a Mexican civil servant, economist, and academic.

== Biography ==
Víctor Urquidi was born in Neuilly, France. Considered one of the most outstanding Mexican economists of the 20th century, he earned a first degree in economics at the London School of Economics in 1940 and, in 1941, joined the economic studies department of the Banco de México (Mexico's central bank).

In July 1944, he was a member of the Mexican delegation to the Bretton Woods Conference. He also worked at the federal Secretariat of Finance and Public Credit, for the Economic Commission for Latin America and the Caribbean (ECLAC), and was on the Executive Committee of the Club of Rome. From 1949 to 1957 he was the editor of the journal El Trimestre Económico.

In 1964, Urquidi was one of the founders of the Centre for Economic and Demographic Studies of the Colegio de México, which enabled the creation of Mexico's first postgraduate course in economics. He served as president of the Colegio de México from 1966 to 1985 and, in 1989, was named professor emeritus.

On 1 August 1960, he was elected to the National College, but resigned from it in 1968.

He received the National Science and Arts Prize in 1977 and the National Demography Prize in 1994 for his research into Mexican migration to the United States.

Victor Urquidi had two children by his first marriage to Marjory Jean Mattingly: Joaquín Urquidi, born in 1947, and Marina Urquidi, born in 1949, both in Washington, DC, when he was working for the World Bank. In 1982 he and Sheila Ann Breen were married and were together until Victor's death in Mexico City in 2004.

== Works ==
Most of his works were published by the Fondo de Cultura Económica, including:

- 1962: Viabilidad económica de América Latina
- 1996: México en la globalización
- 2000: La globalización y las opciones nacionales. Memoria
- 2005: Otro siglo perdido. Las políticas de desarrollo en América Latina (1930-2004)

== External links and references ==
- Víctor Urquidi: Biography
- Víctor Urquidi: El Colegio Nacional
- Interview with Víctor L. Urquidi
- Interview of Victor Urquidi by Thomas Weiss
