= Gustavo Garza Villarreal =

Gustavo Garza
- Born: Monterrey, Nuevo León, Mexico

Academic background
- Education: El Colegio de México, National Autonomous University of Mexico, Universidad Autónoma de Nuevo León

Academic work
- Discipline: Urban economics
- School or tradition: Structuralist economics
- Awards: Guggenheim Fellowship, Economics National Award (Mexico)

Gustavo Garza is a Mexican economist, emeritus Researcher of the National Council of Science and Technology in Mexico and Professor of Urban Economics at El Colegio de México. He obtained his B.A. in economics from the Universidad Autónoma de Nuevo León in Monterrey, his master's degree in economics from El Colegio de México and his Ph.D. in economics from the National Autonomous University of Mexico. He also holds a Diploma in Planning and Economic Policy from the University of Cambridge. Garza joined the faculty of El Colegio de México in 1970, where he was the Director of the Center for Demographic, Urban and Environmental Studies. He was also an editor of the Journal of Estudios Demográficos y Urbanos from El Colegio de México, and the Founding Director of the Nuevo León Institute of Urban Studies.

== Writings and awards ==
Garza has published more than 200 articles in leading peer-reviewed academic economics journals, book chapters, 23 specialized books, and other articles. He has been visiting fellow at the University of California, the Brazilian Center of Analysis and Planning (Centro Brasileiro de Análise e Planejamento – CEBRAP), the University of Texas at Austin, the University of Cambridge, the London School of Economics, and the University of Alcalá. Garza has made substantial contributions to the empirical study of urban economics. In particular, his work examining the historical economical evolution of Mexico City has had major influence on political economy and urban studies.

He obtained the Gabino Barreda Medal from the National Autonomous University of Mexico, the Economics National Award (Mexico), and the Guggenheim Fellowship in 1989. He was member of the panel on Urban Dynamics of the American Academy of Arts and Sciences
