= Orlandina de Oliveira =

- Born: Orlandina de Oliveira Barbosa; 25 April 1943 (age 83); Araguari, Minas Gerais, Brazil
- Occupations: sociologist, feminist
- Years active: 1969-present

Orlandina de Oliveira (born 1943) is a Brazilian-born, naturalized Mexican sociologist and professor. Her areas of expertise are on social inequality, the status of women and youth, and the dynamics of labor markets. She has earned numerous honors for her academic research from international universities including the University of Texas at Austin, the University of Paris III: Sorbonne Nouvelle, and Harvard University.

== Biography ==
Orlandina de Oliveira Barbosa was born on 25 April 1943 in Araguari, Minas Gerais, Brazil. She earned a bachelor's degree in Sociology and Politics in 1966 from the Universidade Federal de Minas Gerais and in 1968 obtained a Master's in sociology from Facultad Latinoamericana de Ciencias Sociaes (FLACSO) (Latin American Social Sciences Institute) of Santiago, Chile.

During 1969, de Oliveira worked as a research associate at FLACSO's in Santiago and in 1970 moved to Mexico. She began a professorship in February 1970 at the Center for Economic and Demographic Studies at El Colegio de México (COLMEX). In 1972, she became a naturalized Mexican citizen. De Oliveira earned her PhD in sociology from the University of Texas at Austin in 1975. After completing her doctorate, de Oliveira returned to the Colegio de México and has worked in the Center for Sociological Studies since that time, earning her promotion to the National System of Researchers (SNI) in 1984. Between 1986 and 1987 she served as Academic Coordinator of the Center for Sociological Studies (CES) and from 1988 to 1993 was the Director of CES.

She has held numerous posts as both a visiting researcher and a visiting professor. From 1980 to 1981 she was visiting researcher at the Brazilian Center for Analysis and Planning, São Paulo, Brazil and a visiting researcher in 1989 at the Center for Latin American Studies, University of Texas at Austin. She was honored as the Edward Larocque Tinker Chair by the University of Texas in 1992. In 1994 she was a visiting professor at the Universidade Federal de Minas Gerais, Minas Gerais, Brazil. From 1994 to 1995 she was honored with the Simon Bolivar Chair from the Institut des Hautes Etudes de L'Amerique Latine at the University of Paris III: Sorbonne Nouvelle. In November 1998 she taught a seminar entitled "Démodynamiques" at the Institut national d'études démographiques in Paris.

From 2000 to 2002, de Oliveira was a researcher with the United Nations Research Institute For Social Development working on research about globalization and its effects on the employment of women. She returned to the University of Paris in the academic year 2001–2002, when she was honored as the Alfonso Reyes Chair for the Institut des Hautes Etudes de L'Amerique Latine, Paris. She was honored in the 2003–2004 academic year as the Madero Visiting Scholar for the David Rockefeller Center for Latin American Studies (DRCLAS) at Harvard University in Cambridge, Massachusetts. From 2004 to 2005, she was visiting researcher at the Federal University of Paraná, Brazil.

She has continued to research and publish in Mexico, with many books and articles appearing through 2014.

== Awards ==
- 1992 Edward Larocque Tinker Chair at the Institute of Latin American Studies, Department of Sociology, University of Texas at Austin, Texas
- 1994-1995 Simon Bolivar Chair at the Institut des Hautes Etudes d'Amérique Latine, University of Paris III: Sorbonne Nouvelle, Paris, France
- 2001-2002 Alfonso Reyes Chair at the Institut des Hautes Etudes d'Amérique Latine, University of Paris III: Sorbonne Nouvelle, Paris, France
- 2003-2004 Madero Scholar, Harvard University-David Rockefeller Center for Latin American Studies (DRCLAS), Cambridge, Massachusetts.

== Selected works ==
=== Books ===
- de Oliveira Muñoz, Orlandina. Industrialization, migration and entry labor force changes in Mexico City: 1930-1970 University of Texas at Austin: Austin, Texas (1975) (in English)
- de Oliveira, Orlandina. Migración y absorción de mano de obra en la ciudad de México, 1930-1970 Centro de Estudios Sociológicos: Mexico City, Mexico (1976) (in Spanish)
- de Oliveira, Orlandina. Migración femenina, organización familiar y mercados laborales en México Centro de Estudios Sociológicos: Mexico City, Mexico (1984) (in Spanish)
- de Oliveira, Orlandina. Trabajo, poder y sexualidad El Colegio de México: Mexico City, Mexico (1989) (in Spanish)
- de Oliveira, Orlandina and Bryan R Roberts. Urban development and social inequality in Latin America University of Texas at Austin: Austin, Texas (1992) (in English)
- de Oliveira, Orlandina and Marina Ariza. Imágenes de la familia en el cambio de siglo, universo familiar y procesos demográficos contemporáneos Instituto de Investigaciones Sociales (IISUNAM): Mexico City, Mexico (2004)
- de Oliveira, Orlandina and Brígida García Guzmán. Las familias en el México metropolitano: visiones femeninas y masculinas El Colegio de México: Mexico City, Mexico (2006) (in Spanish)

=== Articles ===
- de Oliveira, Orlandina. "Situación de clase y contenidos ideológicos (análisis de comerciantes y empleados públicos en Santiago de Chile)" Revista Mexicana de Sociología (México), Vol. 33 No. 2 (April–June 1971) pp. 285–327 (in Spanish)
- de Oliveira, Orlandina and Brígida García Guzmán. "Urbanization, migration and the growth of large cities trends and implications in some developing countries" Internal Conference on Population, United Nations: New York City, New York (1984) (in English)
- de Oliveira, Orlandina and Humberto Muñoz García. "Concentración o desconcentración? datos e hipótesis sobre la ciudad de México y su región" Ciencia (México), Vol. 39, No. 3 (September 1988) pp. 165–177 (in Spanish)
- de Oliveira, Orlandina. "Migration of women, family organization and labour markets in Mexico" Family, household, and gender relations in Latin America, Kegan Paul International: London (1991), pp. 101–118 (in English)
- de Oliveira, Orlandina. "Experiencias matrimoniales en el México urbano la importancia de la familia de origen" Estudios Sociológicos (México), Vol. 13, No. 38 (May–August 1995), pp. 283–308 (in Spanish)
- de Oliveira, Orlandina and Brígida García Guzmán. "Crisis, reestructuracion economica y transformacion de los mercados de trabajo en Mexico" Nueva Epoca (Mexico), Year 4, No. 15, (1998), pp 40–72 (in Spanish)
- de Oliveira, Orlandina and Brígida García Guzmán. "Trabajo, familia y condicion femenina : una revision de las principales perspectivas de analisis" Nueva Epoca (Mexico), Year 5, No. 20, (1999), pp 89–127 (in Spanish)
- de Oliveira, Orlandina and Marielle Pepin Lehalleur. "Rupturas culturales en los relatos autobiograficos de mujeres que migran del campo a la ciudad" Revista Mexicana de Sociología (México) Vol. 62, No. 1, (January–March 2000), p. 123-143 (in Spanish)
- de Oliveira, Orlandina and Brígida García Guzmán. "Transformaciones recientes en los mercados de trabajo metropolitanos de Mexico: 1990-1998" Estudios Sociológicos (México) Vol. 19, No. 57 (September–December 2001) pp. 653–689 (in Spanish)
- de Oliveira, Orlandina. "Reflexiones acerca de las desigualdades sociales y el género" Estudios sociológicos (México), Vol. 25, No. 75 (September–December 2007), pp. 805–812 (in Spanish)
- de Oliveira, Orlandina and Brígida García Guzmán. "Cambios familiares y políticas públicas en América Latina" Annual Review of Sociology, Vol. 37, August 2011
- de Oliveira, Orlandina and Minor Mora Salas. "Las vicisitudes de la inclusión laboral en los albores del siglo XXI: trayectorias ocupacionales y desigualdades sociales entre jóvenes profesionistas mexicanos" Estudios Sociológicos (México), Vol. 30, No. 88, January–April 2012 (in Spanish)
- de Oliveira, Orlandina and Marina Ariza. "Viejos y nuevos retos de la precariedad en el sector terciario, 1995-2010" (coautora ), in Rabell Romero, Cecilia (editor) Los mexicanos. Un balance del cambio demográfico, FCE: México (2014) (in Spanish)
