= Fernando Escalante Gonzalbo =

Mexican sociologist

Fernando Escalante Gonzalbo is a Mexican sociologist and public intellectual of wide renown in Mexico and Spain. He is perhaps most well known for his study of nineteenth-century civic culture in Mexico, Imaginary Citizens, a book that made his reputation as a highly skilled interpreter of Mexican politics and has since gone through three editions. He is the author of over a dozen additional books and a large number of scholarly articles on political theory, historical sociology, and cultural criticism. Escalante also intervenes frequently in the print and television media of Mexico, and has been widely cited in sociological papers and studies on his views of cultural transformation of Mexico.

Escalante received his doctorate in sociology from El Colegio de México, where he is currently a professor of social sciences, politics, culture, and sociology. Escalante has taught at other universities in Mexico, Spain and the United States, and in Spring 2005 was the Tinker Visiting Professor in History at the University of Chicago. He is the editor of several collections at the Paidós publishing house and a member of the journal Public Culture’s Editorial Collective.

== Selected books ==
- El crimen como realidad y representación: contribución para una historia del presente, México, El Colegio de México, 2012.
- A la sombra de los libros. Lectura, mercado y vida pública, México, El Colegio de México, 2008.
- In the Eyes of God: A Study on the Culture of Suffering, trans. Jessica C. Locke. Austin, University of Texas Press, 2006.
- Estampas de Liliput. Bosquejos para una sociología de México, México, Fondo de Cultura Económica, 2004.
- Los derechos civiles, Campaña Nacional por los Derechos Civiles, México, Ronda Ciudadana, 2001.
- La mirada de Dios. Estudio sobre la cultura del sufrimiento, México, Paidós, 2000.
- La democracia mafiosa, México, Reflexiones sobre el Cambio A.C., 1999.
- Una idea de las ciencias sociales, México, Paidós, 1999.
- El Principito, México, Cal y Arena, 1995 (1st ed. reprint: 1996).
- Ciudadanos imaginarios. Memorial de los afanes y desventuras de la virtud y apología del vicio triunfante en la República mexicana: tratado de moral pública, México, El Colegio de México, 1992 (3rd ed. Reprint: 1998).
- La política del terror: apuntes para una teoría del terrorismo, México, Fondo de Cultura Económica, 1991.
