= José Luis Lezama =

Mexican scientist (born 1952)

José Luis Lezama de la Torre
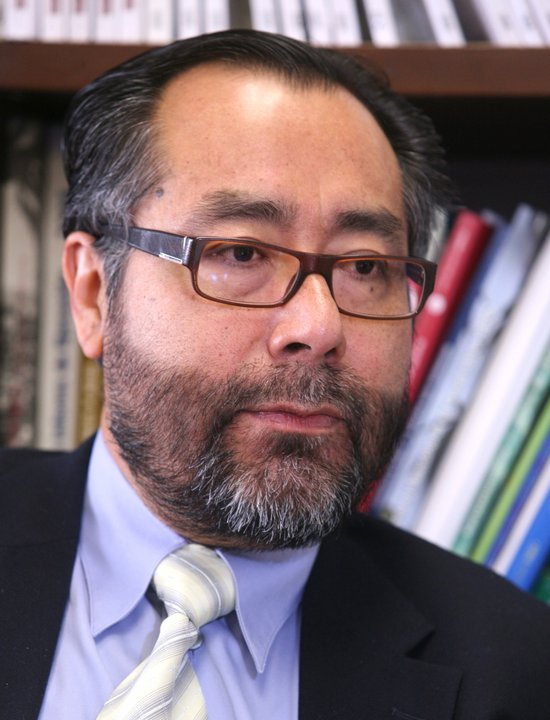
- Born: June 4, 1952 (age 74); Tenosique, Tabasco, Mexico

Philosophical work
- Era: 20th-century
- Region: Environmental sociology

José Luis Lezama (born June 4, 1952) is a Mexican researcher in the fields of environmental sciences, urbanism, and demography.

== Career ==
José Luis Lezama earned his PhD in Social Sciences with specialization in Environmental Policy at the Faculty of Environmental Studies, University College London in the United Kingdom. Lezama was the Director of the Centre for Demographic, Urban and Environmental Studies (CEDUA) of El Colegio de México (2003–2009) and Director of the Interdisciplinary Seminar on Environmental Studies at El Colegio de México. He was visiting professor at the Massachusetts Institute of Technology (MIT) in the Department of Air, Atmospheric and Planetary Sciences, coordinating the Chapter on Environmental Policy and Institutional Analysis in the Mexico City Air Quality Project under the coordination of the Nobel prize winner Mario Molina. He was Visiting Researcher in the Faculty of Architecture at the Université catholique de Louvain, Belgium and Visiting Researcher at Johns Hopkins University in the Department of Population Dynamics, The Institute of Political Studies (Sciences Po Paris), The National Institute of Demography (INED) France and the University of Alcalá de Henares, Spain. Lezama was a columnist in the Mexican national newspaper Reforma (1996–2014) writing on environmental, technological and social issues. He has recently been appointed as a member of the advisory board of the United Nation Program on Human Settlements UN Habitat, is Honourable Mention in the Mexican National Ecological Award and National Prize in Environmental Journalism 2008.

== Books ==
1) Nature before the divine triad: Marx, Durkheim, Weber. El Colegio de México 2019. 2)Climate Change, City and Environmental Management. The National and International Fields (Coord. 2018); 3) The Human and non Human Construction of the World: The Maya Tribe of the Cojoes behind the God Pochó of Death. 4) Energy Policy and Sustainability (2014); 5) Population, City and Environment in Contemporary Mexico; 6) Environment, Society and Government: The Institutional Question; 7) The Social and Political Construction of Environment (2004); 8) The Environment Today: Crucial Issues in the Contemporary Debate (2003); 9) Divided Air: Criticism to the Air Pollution Policy in the valley of Mexico (2000); 10) Social Theory, Space and City (1993 with seven editions); 10) Society, Space and Population (1990).

== Awards ==
Prize to the National Ecological Merit. Honorific Mention (2002). Semarnat.

National Journalism Prize José Pagés Llergo for environment (2009)
