= Silvio Zavala =

Mexican historian (1909–2014)

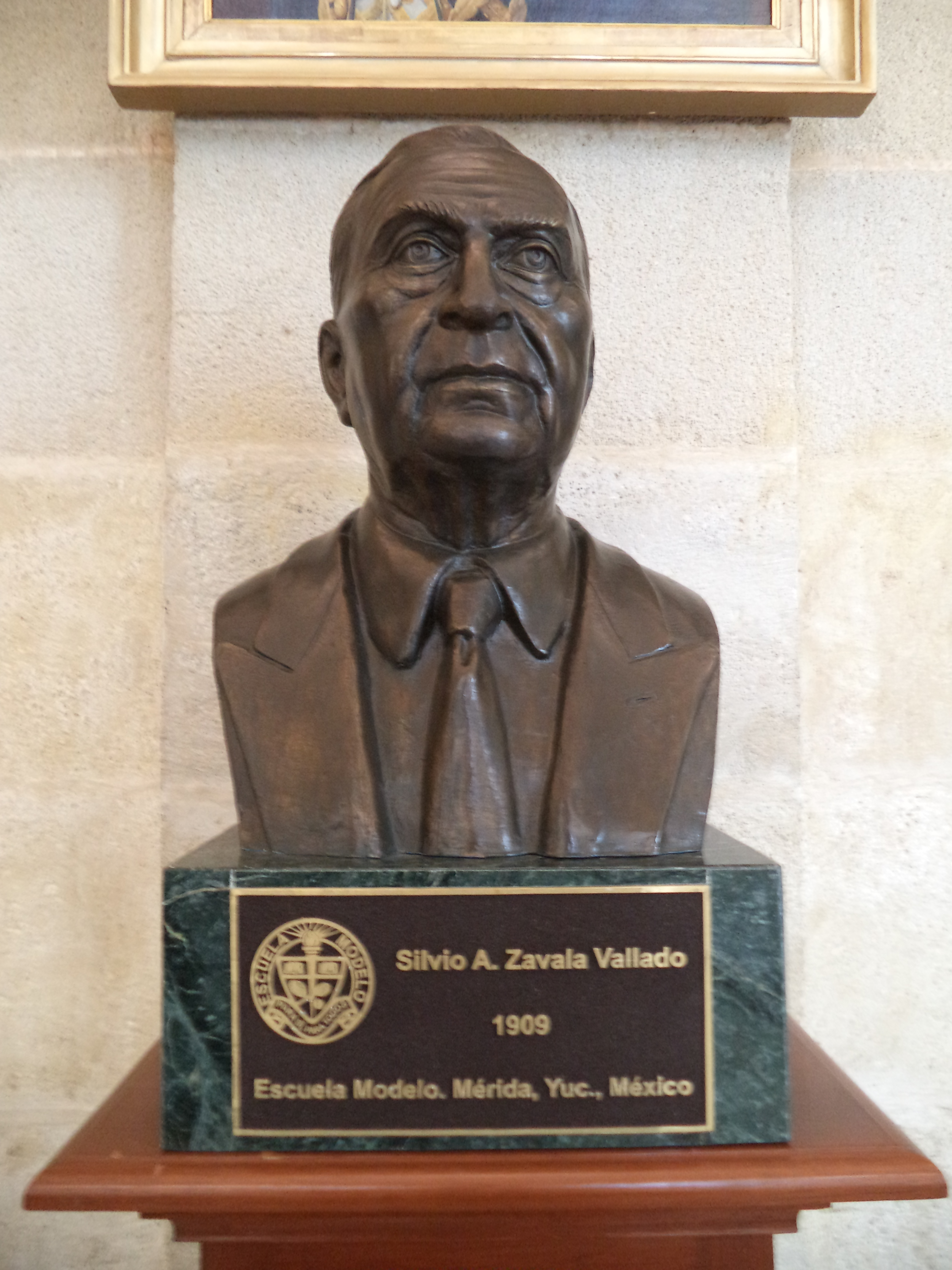
- Born: February 7, 1909; Mérida, Yucatán, Mexico
- Died: December 4, 2014 (aged 105); Mexico City, Mexico
- Occupation: Historian
- Awards: Guggenheim Fellowship, 1937; National Prize for Arts and Sciences, 1969

Silvio Arturo Zavala Vallado (February 7, 1909 – December 4, 2014) was a Mexican historian who was considered to be a pioneer in law history studies and Mexico’s institutions.

== Biography ==
=== Early life ===
Silvio Zavala was born on February 7, 1909, in Mérida, Yucatán. He studied at the National University of Mexico and at the University of Madrid, where he received a Ph.D. in Law.

=== Career ===
He began his professional career in Spain in the Center for Historic Studies in Madrid.

He was a member of El Colegio Nacional since January 6, 1947, and of the Board of the Chronicle of Mexico City. He received the 1969 National Literature Award; the Vasco de Quiroga Medal (1986); the Rafael Heliodoro Valle Award (1988); the Eligio Ancona Medal; and the Prince of Asturias Award. He served as Ambassador of Mexico in France from 1966 to 1975.

He wrote over sixty books and two hundred and fifty articles. In May 2008, at the age of 99, the National Institute of Anthropology and History (INAH) bestowed upon him the Acknowledgment to a Lifetime Career to honor his work as a historian, scholar, researcher, thinker and cultural advocate. He died in Mexico City on December 5, 2014, at the age of 105.

== Selected works ==
- Las instituciones jurídicas en la conquista de América, Madrid, 1935.
- La encomienda indiana, Madrid, 1935.
- Fuentes para la historia del trabajo en Nueva España, Mexico, 1939-1946.
- Ideario de Vasco de Quiroga, Mexico, 1941.
- New Viewpoints on the Spanish Colonization of America, Philadelphia, University of Pennsylvania Press, 1943.
- Ensayos sobre la colonización española en América, Buenos Aires, 1944.
- La filosofía política en la conquista de América, Mexico, 1947.
- Aproximaciones a la historia de México, Mexico, 1953.
- Sir Thomas More in New Spain: A Utopian Adventure of the Renaissance, Londres, Canning House, 1955.
- La defensa de los derechos del hombre en América Latina (siglos XVI-XVIII), Paris, UNESCO, 1963.
- Recuerdo de Vasco de Quiroga, Mexico City, Editorial Porrúa, 1965.
- El Mundo Americano en la Época Colonial, Mexico, Editorial Porrúa, 1968.
- Orígenes de la colonización en el Río de la Plata, Mexico City, El Colegio Nacional, 1978.

== See also ==
- Mexican literature
