= Javier Garciadiego =

Mexican historian (born 1951)

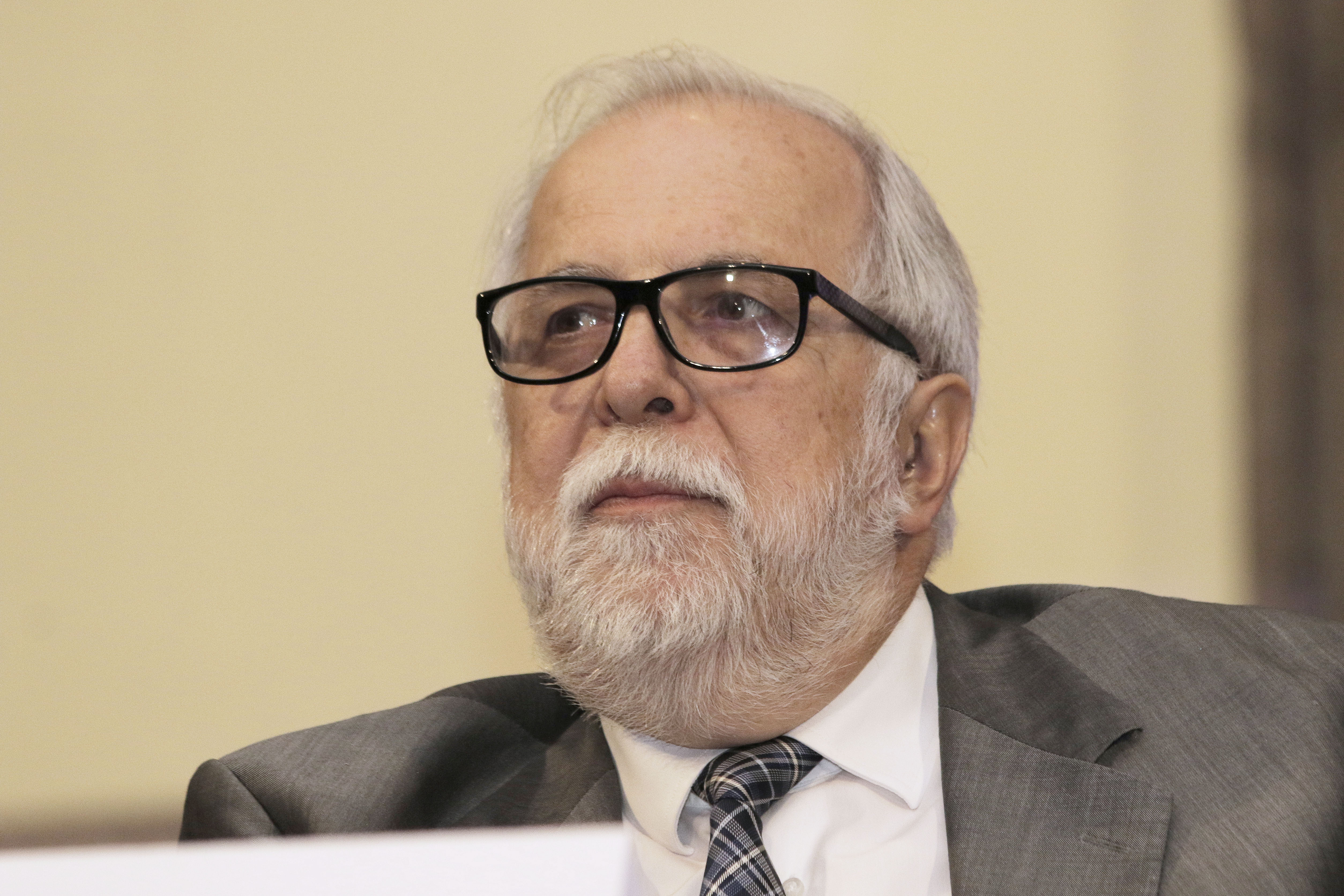
- 2018. In the Museum of Mexico City, the CDMX Secretary of Culture, Eduardo Vázquez Martín
- Born: 5 September 1951 (age 74)
- Education: National Autonomous University of Mexico, El Colegio de México and the University of Chicago
- Occupations: Academic and historian
- Employer: El Colegio de México
- Title: President
- Term: 2005-2010
- Predecessor: Andrés Lira

Francisco Javier Garciadiego Dantán (born 5 September 1951) is a Mexican historian specialized in the Mexican Revolution who formerly served as president of El Colegio de México. He is a former director-general of the National Institute of Historical Studies on the Mexican Revolutions (INEHRM), has authored several books and holds the 12th seat of the Mexican Academy of History, where he substituted the late Beatriz de la Fuente.

Garciadiego graduated with a bachelor's degree in political science from the National Autonomous University of Mexico (UNAM). He received a doctorate degree in history at El Colegio de México (1982) and completed a second one in History of Latin America at the University of Chicago, in the United States, where he was advised by Friedrich Katz.

He joined El Colegio de México as a professor in 1991 and has worked as visiting scholar at St Anthony's College, University of Oxford; University of Chicago; Trinity College, Dublin; Complutense University of Madrid and University of Salamanca. On 25 March 2009 he was awarded the Great Cross of the Order of Isabella the Catholic by the Government of Spain.

== Selected works ==
- Rudos contra científicos: la Universidad Nacional durante la Revolución Mexicana (El Colegio de México, 1996)
- La Revolución Mexicana: crónicas, documentos, planes y testimonios (UNAM, 2003)
- Alfonso Reyes (Planeta, 2003)
