= Sistema Nacional de Investigadores =

Mexico's national system of researchers

- Established: 1984
- Mission: Promote quantity and quality of professional research in Mexico
- President: Liza Aceves López
- Members: 30,548 (2019)
- Location: Mexico, Mexico City
- Website: https://www.secihti.mx/snii/

Sistema Nacional de Investigadores (National System of Researchers) or SNI is a governmental agency established in Mexico in 1984 to promote both the quantity and quality of research in Mexico, especially in the sciences. In the 1980s, the country suffered from "brain drain," with talent leaving Mexico for better economic opportunities in other places in the world. SNI first worked to establish compensation guides to keep researchers in the country, but since has also been involved in the reform of Mexico's graduate-level education. Membership in the system is prestigious, especially in Levels II, III, and Emeritus, which require demonstration of significant contributions in research as well as teaching and the promotion of research in Mexico.

== The organization ==
The Sistema Nacional de Investigadores (National System of Researchers) is a governmental agency which promotes and evaluates professional research activity in Mexico. Its objective is to promote and strengthen the quantity and quality of research in Mexico through the evaluation of the work done. It promotes the interests of researchers through social and political work. It is a subsidiary of the Consejo Nacional de Ciencia y Tecnología (CONACYT) and an integral part of the Sistema de Educación Superior y Científico in Mexico. The organization has been key in representing academia to the federal government. It works to increase the number of active researchers in Mexico, both by the creation and retention of prominent researchers as well as working to link research to teaching quality in higher education, with a particular focus on the hard sciences. The organization also offers research grants, which as of 2009 totaled over two billion pesos.

It is a cornerstone of the higher education system in the country, and is authorized to rank both research and researchers. The prestige of membership in the system has no equal in Mexico, and most of Mexico's universities and research institutions have links to the organization. However, the organization has been criticized in the 2000s. One criticism of the organization is that it has replaced universities in the function of evaluating research in Mexico. However, most institutions of higher education in Mexico accept the organization's evaluations. Another is that the system gives insufficient or no recognition to the work involved in teaching and the diffusion of research results (conferences, etc.). It also does not create a distinction between those in the physical and social sciences or humanities even though they have different ways of working.

== Membership ==
Evaluation of members and potential members mostly relies on their academic credentials and production but also includes other factors such as the creation of programs and projects. To become and remain a member of the SNI, researchers must show a history of systematic research in their fields, done as part of their employment with a university or research institution and duly documented. At least twenty hours per week must be spent in research if in Mexico or work must be completely research related if abroad. Researchers are evaluated through the publication of articles, books, research results and book chapters as well as patents, technological innovations and technology transfer, if applicable. Other areas for evaluation include the direction of professional and post-graduate theses, the teaching of undergraduate and graduate courses and the formation of new researchers and research groups.

There are two main categories, Candidate and National Researcher (Investigador Nacional), with the latter divided into Level I, Level II, Level III and National Researcher Emeritus (Investigador Nacional Emérito ). In order to be admitted as members, applicants must hold a doctoral degree, demonstrate the ability to perform original research in their fields, and must have finished their bachelors not more than fifteen years prior to the application date (although exceptions are made in the last requirement). For Level I, the researcher must also show work in the direction of theses and the teaching of undergraduate and graduate courses as well as show evidence of the creation of knowledge in their fields. For Level II, in addition to the previous requisites the research output must be recognized as that of a leader in the field with its quality being assessed by senior members of the System. Graduate level thesis direction and/or other forms of post-baccalaureate mentoring are also required. Level III is reserved for those researchers who have made significant contributions to their fields in Mexico. All levels are subject to periodic re-evaluation, except for Emeritus, which is for life.

Less than half of all researchers in the country are members, and most of the members are concentrated at the grades of Candidate and Level I. Mexican researchers that work abroad and are SNI members do not receive an economical incentive, and their membership is considered as an academic distinction. In recent years, the organization has had difficulty in recruiting younger researchers. Most members, just over fifty percent are in the Mexico City area, with other concentrations of researchers in Baja California, Guanajuato, Hidalgo, State of Mexico, Jalisco, Michoacán, Morelos, Nuevo León, Puebla, San Luis Potosí, Sonora and Veracruz.

== History ==
The idea for the organization began in 1982, when the then economic crisis of the country decimated salaries for researchers, prompting many to leave the country to find opportunities. Its initial promoters include Jorge Flores, Salvador Malo and José Sarukhán, along with Jesús Reyes Heroles (then head of the Secretaría de Educación Pública) and President Miguel de la Madrid.

The outline of the organization was laid out in an October 1983 meeting of the Academia Mexicana de Ciencias (then the Academia de la Investigación Científica) in Oaxtepec, Morelos. The organization was approved by Mexico's president in December 1983 with the first meeting of the executive committee convened in August 1984. Its first priorities were to select the first round of members and then establish salaries for researchers that would counter the effects of "brain drain."

Since its initial formation it has experienced reforms and adjustments to its organization and evaluation criteria, most notably in 1986, 1988, 1993 and 1995. During this time it was part of CONACYT's larger program to reforming post-graduate study in the country, which suffered from low standards and quality.

The organization has grown from its initial 1,200 members to more than 35,000 (2021). It has affected how post graduate study is accredited in Mexico and has been instrumental in the formation of public policies towards research in Mexico, especially in the sciences. However, after twenty five years, there has been institutional fatigue and other issues presented by changing technologies and other challenges in higher education. Mexico still struggles to compete internationally in research. There is still a severe shortage of researchers in the sciences in Mexico as there are only 0.5 researchers per 100,000 economically active people, a rate similar to that of Guatemala and less than that of Argentina. As of 2011, Mexico ranked 35th, behind Brazil, South Africa and China in research activity. Most research activity is concentrated in peer-reviewed articles rather than the economically more important generation of patents.

== See also ==
CONACYT
