= List of sociologists =

This list of sociologists includes people who have made notable contributions to sociological theory or to research in one or more areas of sociology.

== A ==
- Peter Abell (born 1939), British sociologist
- Andrew Abbott (born 1948), American sociologist
- Rabab Abdulhadi (born 1955), Palestinian-American scholar, activist, educator, editor, academic director, and sociologist
- Margaret Abraham, Indian-American sociologist
- Mark Abrams (1906–1994), British sociologist, political scientist and pollster
- Janet Abu-Lughod (1928–2013), American sociologist
- Jane Addams (1860–1935), American social worker, sociologist, public philosopher and reformer
- Theodor Adorno (1903–1969), German philosopher and cultural sociologist
- Richard Alba (1942–2025), American sociologist
- Francesco Alberoni (1929–2023), Italian sociologist
- Martin Albrow (born 1937), British sociologist
- Jeffrey C. Alexander (born 1947), American sociologist
- David Altheide (born 1945), American sociologist
- Louis Althusser (1918–1990), French philosopher and sociologist
- Edwin Amenta, American sociologist
- Nancy Ammerman (born 1950), American sociologist
- Elijah Anderson, American sociologist
- Eric Anderson (born 1968), American-British sociologist
- Kevin B. Anderson (born 1948), American sociologist
- Stanislav Andreski (1919–2007), Polish-British sociologist
- Robert Cooley Angell (1899–1984), American sociologist
- Aaron Antonovsky (1923–1994), Israeli sociologist
- Arjun Appadurai (born 1949), Indian sociologist
- Andrew Arato (born 1944), Hungarian-American sociologist
- Margaret Archer (1943–2023), British sociologist
- Jason Arday (1985–2026), British sociologist
- Hannah Arendt (1906–1975), German political theorist
- Alcira Argumedo (1940–2021), Argentine sociologist
- Aristoteles (384–322 BC), Ancient Greek philosopher and sociologist
- Signe Arnfred (born 1944), Danish sociologist
- Raymond Aron (1905–1983), French philosopher and sociologist
- Stanley Aronowitz, American sociologist
- Giovanni Arrighi (1937–2009), Italian sociologist
- Johan Asplund (1937–2018), Swedish sociologist
- Vilhelm Aubert (1922–1988), Norwegian sociologist
- Francisco Ayala (1906–2009), Spanish sociologist and novelist

== B ==
- Élisabeth Badinter (born 1944), French philosopher and historian
- Patrick Baert (born 1961), British sociologist
- Sergio Bagú (1911–2002), Argentinian sociologist
- Kenneth D. Bailey (born 1943), American sociologist
- Georges Balandier (1920–2016), French sociologist
- Emily Greene Balch (1867–1961), American professor of sociology and Nobel Peace laureate
- Robert Balch, American sociologist
- Étienne Balibar (born 1942), French philosopher and sociologist
- E. Digby Baltzell (1915–1996), American sociologist
- Jack Barbalet, Australian sociologist
- Teresita de Barbieri (1937–2018), Uruguayan-born Mexican feminist sociologist
- Eileen Barker (born 1938), British sociologist and professor
- Barry Barnes (born 1943), British sociologist
- Liberty Barnes, American sociologist
- Roland Barthes (1915–1980), French literary critic, literary and social theorist, philosopher, and semiotician
- Robert Bartholomew (born 1958), American medical sociologist living in New Zealand
- Roger Bartra, Mexican sociologist
- Roger Bastide (1898–1974), French sociologist
- Georges Bataille (1897–1962), French philosopher and sociologist
- Gregory Bateson (1904–1980), English/American cybernetician
- Jean Baubérot (born 1941), French historian and sociologist
- Christian Baudelot (born 1938), French sociologist
- Jean Baudrillard (1929–2007), French cultural theorist
- Zygmunt Bauman (1925–2017), Polish/British sociologist
- Frank Bean (born 1942), American sociologist
- Peter Bearman (born 1956), American sociologist
- Ulrich Beck (1944–2015), German sociologist
- Gary Becker (1930–2014), American economist
- Howard P. Becker (1899–1960), American sociologist
- Howard S. Becker (1928–2023), American sociologist
- Jens Beckert (born 1967), German sociologist
- Richard F. Behrendt (1908–1973), German sociologist
- Daniel Bell (1919–2011), American sociologist
- Wendell Bell (1924–2019), American sociologist
- Robert N. Bellah (1927–2013), American sociologist
- Walden Bello (born 1945), Filipino sociologist
- Edvard Beneš (1884–1948), Czechoslovak sociologist and politician
- Reinhard Bendix (1916–1991), German-American sociologist
- Walter Benjamin (1892–1940), German cultural writer and sociologist
- Albert Benschop (1949–2018), Dutch sociologist
- Joseph Berger (1924–2023), American sociologist
- Peter L. Berger (1929–2017), Austro-American sociologist
- Solveig Bergman (born 1955), Finnish sociologist active in gender studies
- Pierre L. van den Berghe, Belgian sociologist
- Henri Bergson (1859–1941), French philosopher
- Jessie Bernard (1903–1996), American feminist sociologist
- Basil Bernstein (1924–2000), British sociologist
- Eduard Bernstein (1850–1932), German politician and intellectual
- Jean-Michel Berthelot (1945–2006), French sociologist
- Joel Best, America sociologist
- Andre Beteille (1934–2026), Indian sociologist
- Gurminder K. Bhambra, British sociologist
- Krishna Bhattachan, Nepalese sociologist
- Robert Bierstedt (1913–1998), American sociologist
- Norman Birnbaum (1926–2019), American sociologist
- Margunn Bjørnholt (born 1958), Norwegian sociologist and economist
- Donald Black (1941–2024), American sociologist
- Blanc de Saint-Bonnet (1815–1880), French philosopher
- Peter Blau (1918–2002), American sociologist
- Kathleen M. Blee (born 1953), American sociologist
- Gisela Bleibtreu-Ehrenberg (1929–2025), German sociologist, ethnologist, and sexologist
- Danielle Bleitrach (born 1938), French sociologist and journalist
- Fred L. Block (born 1947), American sociologist
- David Bloor (born 1942), British sociologist
- Herbert Blumer (1900–1987), American sociologist
- Olivier Bobineau (born 1972), French sociologist
- Sophie Body-Gendrot (1942–2018), French sociologist
- Donald Bogue (1918–2014), American demographer and sociologist
- Manuela Bojadžijev (born 1971), German academic and sociologist
- Luc Boltanski (born 1940), French sociologist
- Louis de Bonald, French philosopher and politician
- Eduardo Bonilla-Silva (born 1962), American sociologist
- Scott Boorman (born 1949), American sociologist
- Charles Booth (1840–1916), British social researcher
- Ernst Borinski (1901–1983), German sociologist
- Atilio Borón, Argentinian sociologist
- Thomas Bottomore (1920–1992), British sociologist
- Raymond Boudon (1934–2013), French sociologist
- Pierre Bourdieu (1930–2002), French sociologist
- Victor Branford (1863–1930), British sociologist
- Ronald Breiger, American sociologist
- John David Brewer (born 1951), British sociologist
- Carl Brinkmann (1885–1954), German sociologist
- David G. Bromley, American sociologist
- Rogers Brubaker, American sociologist
- Hauke Brunkhorst (born 1945), German sociologist
- José Joaquín Brunner (born 1944), Chilean sociologist
- Hans Henrik Reventlow Bruun (born 1943), Danish sociologist
- Lois Bryson (1937–2024), Australian sociologist
- Walter F. Buckley (1921–2006), American sociologist
- Michael Burawoy (1947–2025), American sociologist
- Ernest Burgess (1886–1966), Canadian sociologist
- Tom R. Burns (1937–2025), European-American sociologist
- Ronald Burt (born 1949), American sociologist
- Judith Butler (born 1956), American gender theorist

== C ==
- Werner J. Cahnman (1902–1980), German-American sociologist
- Alain Caillé (born 1944), French sociologist
- Roger Caillois (1913–1978), French sociologist
- Craig Calhoun (born 1952), American sociologist
- Michel Callon (1945–2025), French sociologist
- Charles Camic (born 1951), American sociologist
- Colin Campbell (born 1940), British sociologist
- Elias Canetti (1905–1994), Bulgaria-born novelist and outsider sociologist
- Georges Canguilhem (1904–1995), French intellectual
- Fernando Henrique Cardoso (born 1931), Brazilian sociologist, former President of Brazil
- Gabriel Careaga Medina (1941–2004), Mexican sociologist
- Kathleen Carley, American computational sociologist
- José Casanova (born 1951), Spanish/American sociologist of religion
- Antonio Caso (1883–1946), Mexican sociologist
- Robert Castel (1933–2013), French sociologist
- Julieta Castellanos (born 1952), Honduran sociologist
- Manuel Castells (born 1942), Spanish sociologist and urban planner
- Cornelius Castoriadis (1922–1997), Greek philosopher and political theorist
- Santiago Castro-Gómez (born 1958), Colombian philosopher and sociologist
- Michel de Certeau (1925–1986), French cultural sociologist
- Karen A. Cerulo (born 1957), American sociologist
- Francis Stuart Chapin (1888–1974), American sociologist
- Kathy Charmaz (1939–2020), American sociologist
- Christopher Chase-Dunn (born 1944), American sociologist
- Louis Chauvel (born 1967), French sociologist
- Albert Chavannes (1836–1903), American sociologist
- Andrew Cherlin (born 1948), American sociologist
- Nancy Chodorow (born 1944), American sociologist, psychoanalyst, and gender theorist
- Nicholas A. Christakis (born 1962), American sociologist
- Ann-Dorte Christensen, Danish sociologist
- Chua Beng Huat, Singaporean sociologist
- Aaron Cicourel (1928–2023), American sociologist
- Dieter Claessens (1921–1997), German sociologist
- Adele Clarke (1945–2024), American sociologist
- Simon Clarke (1946–2022), British sociologist
- Lars Clausen (1935–2010), German sociologist
- Marshall B. Clinard (1911–2010), American sociologist (criminology)
- Clifford Clogg (1949–1995), American sociologist
- Richard Cloward (1926–2001), American sociologist
- Ansley J. Coale (1917–2002), American demographer and sociologist
- Philip N. Cohen, American sociologist
- Ronald L. Cohen (1945–2020), American social psychologist
- Stanley Cohen (1942–2013), British sociologist (criminology)
- James Samuel Coleman (1926–1995), American sociologist
- Harry Collins (born 1943), British sociologist
- Patricia Hill Collins (born 1948), American sociologist
- Randall Collins (born 141), American sociologist
- Auguste Comte (1798–1857), French founder of sociology
- Nicolas de Condorcet, French mathematician and early sociologist
- Dalton Conley (born 1969), American sociologist
- R. W. Connell (born 1944), Australian sociologist
- Paul Connerton (1940–2019), British sociologist
- Karen Cook (born 1946), American sociologist
- Charles Cooley (1864–1929), American sociologist
- Anna Julia Cooper (1858–1964), American sociologist
- Lewis A. Coser (1913–2003), American sociologist
- Carl J. Couch (1925–1994), American sociologist
- Douglas E. Cowan (born 1958), Canadian sociologist
- Oliver Cox (1901–1974), Trinidadian-American sociologist
- Maxine Leeds Craig, American sociologist
- Rosemary Crompton (1942–2011), British sociologist
- Colin Crouch (born 1944), British sociologist
- Michel Crozier (1922–2013), French sociologist
- Agustin Cueva (1937–1992), Ecuadorian sociologist
- Stefan Czarnowski (1879–1937), Polish sociologist

== D ==
- Robert Dahl (1915–2014), American political scientist
- Ralf Dahrendorf (1929–2009), German-British sociologist and politician
- Dankwart Danckwerts (1933–2012), German sociologist
- Randy David (born 1946), Filipino sociologist
- Leonore Davidoff (1932–2014), American-British sociologist and historian
- Kingsley Davis (1908–1997), American sociologist
- Georges Davy (1883–1976), French sociologist
- Christopher Dawson (1889–1970), British sociologist and Catholic historian
- François de Singly (born 1948), French sociologist
- Régis Debray (born 1940), French mediologist
- Alexander Deichsel (born 1935), German sociologist
- Christine Delphy (born 1941), French sociologist, feminist, and theorist
- Gilles Deleuze (1925–1995), French philosopher
- Donatella della Porta (born 1956), Italian sociologist and political scientist
- Christine Delphy (born 1941), French sociologist
- Bogdan Denitch (1929–2016), American sociologist
- Norman K. Denzin (1941–2023), American sociologist
- Régis Dericquebourg (born 1947), French sociologist of religions
- Jacques Derrida (1930–2004), French philosopher
- Matthew Desmond, American sociologist
- Heinz Dieterich (1943–2026), German-Mexican sociologist
- Bulent Diken (born 1964), Danish sociologist
- Wilhelm Dilthey (1833–1911), German historian, psychologist and sociologist
- Helen Dinerman (1920–1974), American public opinion researcher
- Gail Dines (born 1958), British-American sociologist
- Paul DiMaggio (born 1951), American cultural sociologist
- Georgi Dimitrov Dimitrov (born 1958), Bulgarian sociologist
- Thomas A. DiPrete (bborn 1950), American sociologist
- Stuart C. Dodd (1900–1975), American sociologist
- G. William Domhoff (born 1936), American sociologist
- Orna Donath (born 1976), Israeli sociologist
- Pierpaolo Donati (born 1946), Italian sociologist
- Ronald P. Dore (1925–2018), British sociologist
- Theotônio dos Santos (1936–2018), Brazilian sociologist
- Mary Douglas (1921–2007), British anthropologist and sociologist of perception
- Tommy Douglas (1904–1986), Canadian politician
- W. E. B. Du Bois (1868–1963), American sociologist and civil rights leader
- Denis Duclos (born 1947), French sociologist
- Otis Dudley Duncan (1921–2004), American sociologist
- Mitchell Duneier, American sociologist
- Eric Dunning (1936–2019), British sociologist
- Émile Durkheim (1858–1917), French sociologist
- Troy Duster (born 1936), American sociologist
- Maurice Duverger (1917–2014), French sociologist
- Jean Duvignaud (1921–2007), French sociologist

== E ==
- Gerald L. Eberlein (1930–2010), German sociologist
- Alain Ehrenberg (born 1950), French sociologist
- Eugen Ehrlich (1862–1922), German sociologist
- Shmuel Noah Eisenstadt (1923–2010), Israeli sociologist
- Riane Eisler (born 1931), cultural historian, systems scientist, educator, and attorney
- Glen Elder (born 1934), American sociologist
- Norbert Elias (1897–1990), German sociologist
- Jacques Ellul (1912–1994), French sociologist
- Jon Elster (born 1940), Norwegian sociologist
- Mustafa Emirbayer, American sociologist
- Hugo O. Engelmann (1917–2002), American sociologist
- Friedrich Engels (1820–1895), German socialist philosopher
- Paula England (born 1949), American sociologist
- Ronald Enroth (1938–2023), American sociologist
- Kai T. Erikson (1931–2025), American sociologist
- Fernando Escalante Gonzalbo, Mexican sociologist
- Gosta Esping-Andersen (born 1947), Danish sociologist
- Roger Establet ((1938–2026), French sociologist
- Amitai Etzioni (1929–2023), American sociologist
- Peter B. Evans (born 1944), American sociologist

== F ==
- Orlando Fals Borda (1925–2008), Colombian sociologist
- Frantz Fanon (1929–1961), Martinican intellectual and sociologist
- Rick Fantasia, American sociologist
- Thomas Fararo (1933–2020), American mathematical sociologist
- Sara R. Farris, Italian sociologist of feminism and migration
- Didier Fassin (born 1955), French sociologist
- Paul Fauconnet (1874–1938), French sociologist
- Joe Feagin (born 1938), American sociologist
- Mike Featherstone, British sociologist
- Fei Xiaotong (1910–2005), Chinese sociologist and anthropologist
- Anuška Ferligoj (born 1947), Slovenian mathematical sociologist
- Florestan Fernandes (1920–1995), Brazilian sociologist
- Myra Marx Ferree (born 1949), American sociologist
- Enrico Ferri (1856–1929), Italian sociologist and criminologist
- Mileva Filipović (1938–2020), Montenegrin sociologist and gender studies pioneer
- Gary Alan Fine (born 1950), American sociologist
- Claude Fischer (born 1948), American author of the subcultural theory of urbanism
- George Fitzhugh (1806–1881), American social theorist
- Crystal Marie Fleming (born 1981), American sociologist and author
- Peter Flora (born 1944), Austrian sociologist
- Heinz von Foerster (1911–2002), Austrian/American cybernetician
- Pim Fortuyn (1948–2002), Dutch sociologist author and politician
- Daniel A. Foss (1940–2014), American sociologist
- John Bellamy Foster (born 1953), American sociologist and journalist
- Michel Foucault (1926–1984), French philosopher
- Alfred Jules Émile Fouillée (1838–1912), French philosopher and sociologist
- Charles Fourier (1772–1837), French proto-sociologist
- Renée Fox (1928–2020), American sociologist
- Frances Fox Piven (born 1932), American sociologist
- Andre Gunder Frank (1929–2005), German economic historian and sociologist
- Mary Frank Fox, American sociologist
- Nancy Fraser (born 1947), American social theorist
- Hans Freyer (1887–1969), German sociologist and philosopher
- Gilberto Freyre (1900–1987), Brazilian sociologist
- Erhard Friedberg (born 1942), Austrian sociologist
- Samuel R. Friedman (born 1942), American sociologist and epidemiologist
- Georges Friedmann (1902–1977), French sociologist
- Steve Fuller (born 1959), American sociologist
- Frank Furstenberg (born 1940), American sociologist
- Celso Furtado (1920–2004), Brazilian economist

== G ==
- Luciano Gallino (1927–2015), Italian sociologist
- Francis Galton (1822–1911), English statistician
- Johan Galtung (1930–2024), Norwegian sociologist, mathematician, and founder of peace studies
- Diego Gambetta (born 1952), Italian sociologist
- Herbert J. Gans (1927–2025), American sociologist
- Néstor García Canclini (bon 1939), Argentinian-Mexican sociologist
- Brígida García Guzmán (1947–2020), Dominican-Mexican sociologist
- Delphine Gardey (born 1967), French sociologist
- Harold Garfinkel (1917–2011), American sociologist
- David W. Garland, British sociologist
- Manuel Antonio Garretón (born 1943), Chilean sociologist
- Romeo B. Garrett (1910–2000), American sociologist
- Marcel Gauchet (born 1946), French sociologist
- John Gaventa (born 1949), American-British sociologist
- Patrick Geddes (1854– 1932), Scottish sociologist
- Clifford Geertz (1926–2006), American anthropologist
- Arnold Gehlen (1904–1976), German philosopher and sociologist
- Theodor Geiger (1891–1952), German sociologist
- Ernest Gellner (1925–1995), Czech-British philosopher and social anthropologist
- Uta Gerhardt (born 1938), German sociologist
- Govind Sadashiv Ghurye (1893–1983), Indian sociologist
- Anthony Giddens (born 1938), English sociologist
- Franklin Henry Giddings (1855–1931), American sociologist
- Ayelet Giladi (born 1964), Israeli educational sociologist
- Dennis Gilbert (born October 7, 1943), American Sociologist
- Nigel Gilbert (born 1950), British sociologist
- Charlotte Perkins Gilman (1860–1935), American sociologist
- Paul Gilroy (born 1956), British sociologist
- Salvador Giner (1934–2019), Spanish sociologist
- Corrado Gini (1884–1965), Italian statistician
- Morris Ginsberg (1889–1970), British sociologist
- Herbert Gintis (1940– 2023), American behavioral scientist
- Henry Giroux (born 1943), American sociologist of education
- Todd Gitlin (1943–2022), American sociologist
- Barney Glaser (1930–2022), American sociologist
- David Glass (1911–1978), British sociologist
- Barry Glassner (born 1952), American sociologist
- Nathan Glazer (1923–2019), American sociologist
- Max Gluckman (1911–1975), South African/English social anthropologist
- Erving Goffman (1922–1982), Canadian interactionistic sociologist
- Steven J. Gold (born 1955), American sociologist
- Lucien Goldmann (1913–1970), Romanian/French sociologist
- Jack Goldstone (born 1953), American sociologist
- John H. Goldthorpe (born 1935), British sociologist
- Yasunosuke Gonda (1887–1951), Japanese sociologist
- Pablo González Casanova (1922–2023), Mexican sociologist
- Jeff Goodwin (born 1958), American sociologist
- Roger V. Gould (1962–2002), American sociologist
- Alvin Gouldner (1920–1980), American sociologist
- Ziya Gökalp (1876–1924), Turkish sociologist, writer, poet and political activist
- Isacque Graeber (1905–1984), sociologist and Jewish historian
- Antonio Gramsci (1891–1937), Italian Marxist and social theorist
- Mark Granovetter (born 1943), American sociologist
- Richard Grathoff (1934–2013), German sociologist and phenomenologist
- Andrew M. Greeley (1928–2013), American sociologist, priest, writer
- Andrew Greeley (1928–2013), an American Catholic priest, sociologist, journalist and novelist.
- Liah Greenfeld (born 1954), Russian/American sociologist
- Leonid Grinin (born 1958), Russian sociologist
- Wendy Griswold (born 1946), American sociologist
- Ramón Grosfoguel (born 1956), Puerto Rican sociologist
- Jaber F. Gubrium , American sociologist
- Ludwig Gumplowicz (1838–1909), Polish sociologist, one of the founders of European sociology
- Dipankar Gupta (born 1949), Indian sociologist
- Georges Gurvitch (1894–1965), Russian/French sociologist
- Dimitrie Gusti (1880–1955), Romanian sociologist, the creator of the sociological monographic method

== H ==
- Jürgen Habermas (born 1929), German social theorist
- Jeffrey K. Hadden (1937–2003), American sociologist
- Maurice Halbwachs (1877–1945), French philosopher and sociologist
- Drew Halfmann (born 1967), American sociologist
- Tomáš Halík (born 1948), Czech Catholic priest, philosopher, sociologist, and theologian
- Bente Halkier (born 1964), Danish sociologist
- John A. Hall (born 1949), British/Canadian sociologist
- Stuart Hall (1932–2014), British cultural theorist
- Jean Halley (born 1967), American sociologist
- Michael T. Hannan (born 1943), American sociologist
- Donna Haraway (born 1944), American gender and technology theorist
- Eszter Hargittai (born 1973), Hungarian sociologist
- Marta Harnecker (1937–2019), Chilean sociologist
- Valérie Harvey (born 1979), Canadian writer and sociologist
- Chandrakala A. Hate (1903–1990), Indian sociologist, social worker, and author
- Arnold Hauser, Hungarian-German sociologist
- James Hawdon, American sociologist and professor
- Darnell Hawkins (born 1946), American sociologist, criminologist, and emeritus professor
- Amos Hawley (1910–2009), American sociologist
- Peter Hedström (born 1955), Swedish sociologist
- Samuel Heilman, American sociologist
- Peter Heintz (1920–1983), Swiss sociologist
- Wilhelm Heitmeyer (born 1945), German sociologist
- Dirk Helbing (born 1965), Swiss sociologist
- Horst Helle (1934–2026), German sociologist
- Ágnes Heller (1929–2019), Hungarian philosopher and sociologist
- Celia Stopnicka Heller (1922–2011), American sociologist
- Will Herberg (1901–1977), American sociologist
- John Heritage (born 1946), American sociologist
- Robert Hertz (1881–1915), French sociologist
- Danièle Hervieu-Léger (born 1947), French sociologist
- Michael D. Higgins (born 1941), Irish sociologist and former Irish president
- Reuben Hill (1912–1985), American sociologist
- Ulf Himmelstrand (1924–2011), Swedish sociologist
- Travis Hirschi (1935–2017), American sociologist
- Paul Hirst (1946–2003), British sociologist
- Thomas Hobbes (1588–1679), British philosopher
- Leonard Trelawny Hobhouse (1864–1929), pioneer British sociologist
- Arlie Russell Hochschild (born 1940), American sociologist
- Richard Hoggart (1918–2014), British sociologist
- John Holloway (born 1947), Irish sociologist
- Susanne Holmström (born 1947), Danish sociologist
- Robert J. Holton (born 1946), British sociologist
- George C. Homans (1910–1989), American behavioral sociologist
- Pierrette Hondagneu-Sotelo, American sociologist
- Axel Honneth (born 1949), German social theorist
- Ida R. Hoos (1912–2007), American sociologist
- Max Horkheimer (1895–1973), German social theorist
- Irving Louis Horowitz (1929–2012), American sociologist
- Eugenio María de Hostos (1839–1903), Puerto Rican sociologist
- Michael Hout (born 1950), American sociologist
- François Houtart (1925–2017), Belgian sociologist
- Philip N. Howard (born 19700, Canadian-American sociologist
- Spomenka Hribar (born 1941), Slovenian sociologist, philosopher, politician, and public intellectual
- Joan Huber (1925–2026), American sociologist
- Everett Hughes (1897–1983), American sociologist
- Stephen J. Hunt, British sociologist
- James Davison Hunter (born 1955), American sociologist
- Herbert Hyman (1918–1985), American sociologist

== I ==
- Octavio Ianni (1926–2004), Brazilian sociologist
- Ibn Khaldun (1332/ah732–1406/ah808), North African historian, forerunner of modern historiography, sociology, and economics
- Kancha Ilaiah (born 1952), Indian political scientist and social activist
- Eva Illouz (born 1961), Moroccan sociologist
- José Ingenieros (1877–1925), Argentinian sociologist
- Harold Innis (1894–1952), Canadian sociologist who developed staples theory
- John Keith Irwin (1929–2010), American sociologist known for his expertise on the American prison system
- Larry Isaac, American sociologist

== J ==
- Jacquelyne Jackson (1932–2004), American sociologist and educator
- Stevi Jackson (born 1951), British sociologist
- Jane Jacobs (1916–2006), American theorist with wide influence on urban sociology
- Janet L. Jacobs (born 1948), American sociologist
- Michael Hviid Jacobsen (born 1971), Danish sociologist
- Eliezer Jaffe (1933–2017), Israeli-American sociologist
- Marie Jahoda (1907–2001), Austrian-British sociologist and social psychologist
- Marie Jaisson, French sociologist
- Ayesha Jalal, Pakistani-American historian, sociologist, and professor
- Fredric Jameson (1934–2024), American philosopher and social theorist
- Morris Janowitz (1919–1988), American sociologist
- James M. Jasper (born 1957), American sociologist
- Guillermina Jasso, American sociologist
- Gail Jefferson (1938–2008), American sociologist and conversation analyst
- Yasmin Jiwani, feminist academic and activist
- Hans Joas (born 1948), German social theorist
- Carole Joffe, American sociologist
- Benton Johnson (born 1928), American sociologist
- Guy Benton Johnson (1901–1991), American sociologist
- Miriam M. Johnson (1928–2007), American sociologist
- Rodrigo Jokisch (born 1946), German-Mexican sociologist and social theorist
- Frank Lancaster Jones (born 1937), Australian sociologist
- Lewis Wade Jones (1910–1979), African/American sociologist and educator
- Danny Jorgensen (born 1951), American sociologist
- Paul Jorion (born 1946), Belgian American sociologist and cognitive scientist
- Mark Juergensmeyer (born 1940), American sociologist

== K ==
- Dirk Kaesler (born 1944), German sociologist
- Boris Kagarlitsky, Russian sociologist
- Irawati Karve, Indian anthropologist and sociologist
- Alexandr Kapto, Russian and Ukrainian scientist, sociologist, and political scientist; a diplomat, journalist, politician, and statesman
- Elihu Katz, American sociologist
- Nitasha Kaul, Indian Kashmiri sociologist, writer, and poet
- Karl Kautsky, Czech Marxist theorist
- Vytautas Kavolis, Lithuanian-American sociologist and literary critic
- Frances Kellor (1873–1952), American sociologist, social reformer, and investigator
- Stephen A. Kent, Canadian sociologist
- Lane Kenworthy, American sociologist
- Sherin Khankan, Danish sociologist
- Abdelkebir Khatibi (1938–2009), Moroccan literary critic, novelist, philosopher, playwright, poet, and sociologist
- Aquila Berlas Kiani (1921–2012), Indian sociologist and educator
- Benjamin Kidd, British sociologist
- Baruch Kimmerling, Israeli sociologist
- Susan Myra Kingsbury (1870–1949), American sociologist
- Julieta Kirkwood (1936–1985), Chilean sociologist, political scientist, and feminist activist
- Evelyn M. Kitagawa (1920–2007), American sociologist, demographer, and educator
- John Kitsuse, Japanese-American sociologist
- Gabriele Klein (born 1957), sociologist, dance theorist, and educator
- Bernardo Kliksberg, Argentinian sociologist
- Eric Klinenberg, American sociologist
- Karin Knorr Cetina (born 1944), Austrian sociologist
- Antonina Kłoskowska (1919–2001), Polish sociologist
- Karin Knorr Cetina (born 1944), Austrian sociologist
- Katsuya Kodama (born 1959), Japanese sociologist and peace researcher
- Martin Kohli, Swiss sociologist
- Mirra Komarovsky (1905–1999), Russian-American sociologist
- René König (1906–1992), German sociologist
- Andrey Korotayev (born 1961), Russian sociologist
- Reinhart Koselleck (1923–2006), German historian and social theorist
- Maksim Kovalevsky (1851–1916), Russian sociologist
- Siegfried Kracauer, German sociologist
- Julia Kristeva, Bulgarian-French feminist sociologist
- Alfred L. Kroeber (1876–1960), American anthropologist
- Peter Kropotkin (1842–1921), Russian anarchist thinker
- Thomas S. Kuhn (1922–1996), American science theorist
- Eugene M. Kulischer (1891–1956), Russian/American sociologist
- Charles Kurzman, American sociologist
- Martin Kusch, Austrian philosopher and sociologist

== L ==
- William Labov (born 1927), American sociolinguist and dialectologist
- Jacques Lacan (1901–1981), French psychoanalyst
- Richard Lachmann (1956 –2021), American sociologist, specialist in comparative historical sociology
- Ernesto Laclau (1935–2014), Argentinian sociologist
- Joyce Ladner (born 1943), American sociologist and activist
- Imre Lakatos (1922–1974), Hungarian philosopher
- Janja Lalich (born 1945), American sociologist
- Michele Lamont, American sociologist
- Diane Lamoureux (born 1954), Canadian sociologist, professor, and writer
- Edgardo Lander (born 1942), Venezuelan sociologist
- David C. Lane (born 1956), American sociologist
- Silvia Lara Povedano (born 1959), Costa Rican politician and sociologist
- Annette Lareau (born 1952), American sociologist
- Ralph Larkin (borrn 1940), American sociologist
- Scott Lash (born 1945), American sociologist
- Harold Lasswell (1902–1978), American political sociologist
- Bruno Latour (born 1947), French sociologist of science
- Pat Lauderdale (1944–2023), American sociologist
- Peter Lavrovich Lavrov (1823–1900), Russian sociologist
- John Law (born 1946), British sociologist
- Paul F. Lazarsfeld (1901–1976), Austrian/American sociologist
- Gustave Le Bon (1841–1931), French social psychologist
- Frederic Le Play (1806–1882), early French sociologist
- Anna Leander, Danish sociologist
- Emil Lederer (1882–1939), German sociologist
- Henri Lefebvre (1901–1991), French Marxist philosopher
- Enrique Leff (born 1946), Mexican sociologist
- Charles Lemert (born 1937), American sociologist
- Vladimir Lenin (1870–1924), Russian revolutionary and intellectual
- Gerhard Lenski (1924–2015), American evolutionary sociologist
- Magdalena León de Leal (born 1939), Colombian sociologist
- Wolf Lepenies (born 1941), German sociologist
- Yuri Levada (1930–2006), Russian sociologist
- John Levi Martin (born 1964), American sociologist
- Claude Lévi-Strauss (1908–2009), French anthropologist
- Jack Levin (born 1941), American sociologist/criminologist
- Barry B. Levine (1941–2020), American sociologist
- Peggy Levitt (born 1957), American sociologist
- Ruth Levitas (born 1949), British sociologist
- Daniel Levy (born 1962), German-American sociologist
- Lucien Lévy-Bruhl (1857–1939), French philosopher, sociologist, and ethnographer
- Kurt Lewin (1890–1947), German social psychologist
- Loet Leydesdorff (1948–2023), Dutch sociologist
- Li Yinhe (born 1952), Chinese sociologist, sexologist, and activist
- Stanley Lieberson (1933–2018), American sociologist
- Nan Lin (born 1938), American sociologist
- Alfred R. Lindesmith (1905–1991), American sociologist of drug policy
- Juan José Linz (1926–2013), Spanish sociologist
- Gilles Lipovetsky (born 1944), French philosopher
- Seymour Martin Lipset (1922–2006), American comparativist sociologist
- Allen Liska (1940 –1998), American sociologist
- Daniel Little (born 1949), American philosopher and sociologist
- Émile Littré (1801–1881), French philosopher and sociologist, disciple of Comte
- Omar Lizardo (born 1974), American sociologist
- John Locke (1632–1704), English philosopher
- David Lockwood (1929–2014), British sociologist
- Joseph Lopreato (1928–2015), American sociologist
- Martina Löw (born 1965), German sociologist
- Leo Löwenthal (1900–1993), German sociologist
- Michael Löwy (born 1938), Brazilian-French sociologist
- Nathalie Luca (born 1966), French sociologist
- Thomas Luckmann (1927–2016), German sociologist
- Anthony Ludovici (1882–1971), British conservative sociologist and philosopher
- Niklas Luhmann (1927–1998), German sociologist (systems theory)
- György Lukács (1885–1971), Hungarian philosopher
- Steven Lukes (born 1941), British social theorist
- George Lundberg (1895–1966), American sociologist (scientific)
- Rosa Luxemburg (1870–1919), German socialist theoretician
- Robert Staughton Lynd (1892–1970), American sociologist
- David Lyon (born 1948), British sociologist
- Jean-François Lyotard (1924–1998), French philosopher

== M ==
- Amin Maalouf, Lebanese author with a degree in sociology
- Richard Machalek (born 1946), American sociologist and sociobiologist
- Robert Morrison MacIver (1882–1970), Scottish/American sociologist
- Donald A. MacKenzie, British sociologist
- Annie Marion MacLean (1869–1934), Canadian-American applied sociologist
- Michel Maffesoli, French sociologist
- Henry Maine (1822–1888), British jurist and legal historian
- Sinisa Malesevic (born 1969), Irish political and historical sociologist
- Bronisław Malinowski (1884–1942), Polish social anthropologist
- Thomas Malthus (1766–1834), English demographer
- Roberto Mangabeira Unger, Brazilian social theorist
- Michael Mann (born 1942), British/American sociologist
- Karl Mannheim (1893–1947), Hungarian/German sociologist
- Peter K. Manning (born 1940), American sociologist
- José María Maravall, Spanish sociologist
- Herbert Marcuse (1898–1979), German/American sociologist (Frankfurt School)
- Ruy Mauro Marini, Brazilian sociologist
- Władysław Markiewicz (1920–2017), Polish sociologist
- Catherine Marry, French sociologist
- Dennis Marsden, British sociologist
- Alfred Marshall, English economist
- Thomas Humphrey Marshall, British sociologist
- Everett Dean Martin, American sociologist
- Jean Martin, Australian sociologist
- John Levi Martin, American sociologist
- Harriet Martineau (1802–1876), English writer described as 'first female sociologist'
- Alberto Martinelli, Italian sociologist
- Vladimir Martynenko (born 1957), Russian sociologist, economist, political scientist
- Margaret Maruani (born 1954), Tunisian-French sociologist
- Gary T. Marx, American sociologist
- Karl Marx (1818–1883), German political philosopher, social theorist
- Tomáš Garrigue Masaryk, Czech sociologist
- Douglas Massey, American sociologist
- Brian Massumi, Canadian social theorist
- Humberto Maturana, Chilean biologist and sociologist of knowledge
- Marcel Mauss (1872–1950), French sociologist
- Carl R May (born 1961), British medical sociologist
- Claire Maxwell (born 1975), German-Australian sociologist
- Renate Mayntz, German sociologist
- Doug McAdam, American sociologist
- Fayette Avery McKenzie (1872–1957), American sociologist
- Robert McKenzie (1917–1981), Canadian Politics professor and psephologist
- Sara McLanahan, American sociologist
- Marshall McLuhan (1911–1980), Canadian educator, philosopher, and scholar
- George Herbert Mead (1863–1931), American philosopher and social psychologist
- Margaret Mead (1901–1978), American cultural anthropologist
- Cecilia Menjívar, Salvadoran-American sociologist
- Stephen Mennell (born 1944), English sociologist
- Fatema Mernissi (1940–2015), Moroccan feminist writer and sociologist
- Robert K. Merton (1910–2003), American sociologist
- Michael Messner (born 1952), American pro-feminist sociologist
- John W. Meyer, American sociologist
- Robert Michels (1876–1936), Italian-German political sociologist
- Maria Mies, German sociologist
- Ralph Miliband, British sociologist
- C. Wright Mills (1916–1962), American sociologist
- Andrew Milner (born 1950), British-Australian sociologist of literature
- Ann Mische, American sociologist
- Munesuke Mita, Japanese sociologist
- J. Clyde Mitchell (1918–1995), British social anthropologist
- Shinji Miyadai (born 1959), Japanese sociologist
- Tariq Modood, British sociologist
- Abraham Moles (1920–1992), French sociologist, psychologist, and engineer
- Andres Molina Enriquez, Mexican sociologist
- Harvey Molotch, American sociologist
- Montesquieu, French philosopher
- James D. Montgomery, American economist and mathematical sociologist
- Barrington Moore, Jr., American political sociologist
- Wilbert E. Moore, American sociologist
- Jacob L. Moreno, Romanian-American psychosociologist, founder of sociometry
- Edgar Morin, French sociologist
- Aldon Morris, American sociologist
- Gaetano Mosca (1858–1941), Italian political and social scientist
- Serge Moscovici, French psychologist and major influence in the study of social representations and social movements
- Chantal Mouffe, Belgian post-Marxist theorist
- Daniel Patrick Moynihan (1927–2003), American sociologist, diplomat and politician
- Radhakamal Mukerjee, Indian sociologist
- Lewis Mumford, American sociologist
- Peter A. Munch (1908–1984), Norwegian/American sociologist
- Richard Münch, German sociologist
- Charles Murray (born 1943), American sociologist
- Alva Myrdal, Swedish sociologist
- Gunnar Myrdal (1898–1987), Swedish economist, sociologist, and politician

== N ==
- Ashis Nandy (born 1937), Indian sociologist
- Vicenç Navarro (born 1937), Spanish sociologist
- Victor Nee (born 1945), American sociologist
- Antonio Negri (1933–2023), Italian political philosopher and critic of Luhmann
- Oswald von Nell-Breuning (1890–1991), German Roman Catholic theologian, sociologist and social reformer
- Otto Neurath (1882–1945), Austrian sociologist and political economist
- Otto Newman (1922–2015), Austrian-British sociologist
- Norman H. Nie (1943–2015), Inventor of SPSS
- Robert Nisbet (1913–1996), American sociologist
- Helga Nowotny (born 1937), Austrian sociologist

== O ==
- Ann Oakley (born 1944), British sociologist
- Claus Offe (1940–2025), German political sociologist
- William F. Ogburn (1886–1959), American sociologist
- Lloyd Ohlin (1918–2008), American sociologist
- Orlandina de Oliveira (born 1943), Brazilian-Mexican sociologist
- Michael Omi (born 1951), American sociologist
- Gail Omvedt (1941–2021), American/Indian sociologist
- T. K. Oommen (1937–2026), Indian sociologist
- Franz Oppenheimer (1864–1943), German sociologist and political economist
- José Ortega y Gasset (1883–1955), Spanish philosopher
- Stanislaw Ossowski (1897–1963), Polish sociologist
- Dag Østerberg (1938–2017), Norwegian sociologist
- Moisey Ostrogorsky (1853–1921), Russian sociologist

== P ==
- Vilfredo Pareto (1848–1923), Italian economist and sociologist
- Robert E. Park (1864–1944), American sociologist
- Frank Parkin, British sociologist
- Talcott Parsons (1902–1979), American sociologist
- C.J. Pascoe, American sociologist
- Jean-Claude Passeron, French sociologist
- Bindeshwar Pathak (born 1943), Indian sociologist
- Orlando Patterson, Jamaican-American sociologist
- Karl Pearson (1857–1936), English statistician
- Willie Pearson Jr, American sociologist
- Jacqueline Peschard (1965), Mexican sociologist
- James Petras (1937–2026), American sociologist
- Jean Piaget (1896–1980), Swiss developmental psychologist
- Andrew Pickering, British sociologist
- Trevor Pinch, British sociologist
- Alessandro Pizzorno, Italian sociologist
- Michael Plekon, American sociologist
- Helmuth Plessner, German sociologist
- Geoffrey Pleyers, Belgian sociologist
- Adam Podgórecki, Polish-Canadian sociologist
- Joel M. Podolny, American sociologist
- Karl Polanyi, Hungarian economist
- Friedrich Pollock, German social scientist
- Heinrich Popitz, German sociologist
- Karl Popper, Austrian philosopher
- Juan Carlos Portantiero, Argentinian sociologist
- John Porter (1921–1979), Canadian sociologist
- Alejandro Portes, Cuban-American sociologist
- Adam Possamai, Belgian-born sociologist
- Dudley L. Poston Jr., American sociologist
- Nicos Poulantzas (1936–1979), Greek political sociologist
- Émile Poulat, French historian and sociologist
- Walter W. Powell, American sociologist
- Margaret Archer, British sociologist
- Ricardo Pozas Arciniega, Mexican sociologist and anthropologist
- Suzana Prates (1940–1988), Brazilian feminist sociologist and academic
- Anette Prehn, Danish sociologist
- Harriet B. Presser (died 2012), American sociologist and demographer
- Samuel H. Preston, American demographer and sociologist
- Ilya Prigogine, Belgian chemist, main contribution to sociology is dissipative structures theory
- Pierre-Joseph Proudhon (1809–1865), French utopian socialist thinker
- Adam Przeworski, Polish political sociologist
- Jade Puget (born 1973), American musician
- Robert Putnam (born 1941), American political scientist

== Q ==
- Sigrid Quack (born 1958), German sociologist
- Enrico Quarantelli (1924–2017), American sociologist
- Anne Querrien (born 1945), French sociologist and urban planner
- Adolphe Quetelet (1796–1874), French statistician and sociologist
- Anibal Quijano (1930–2017), Peruvian sociologist
- Richard Quinney (born 1934), American sociologist

== R ==
- Alfred Reginald Radcliffe-Brown (1881–1955), British social anthropologist
- Charles C. Ragin, American sociologist
- Gustav Ratzenhofer, Austrian sociologist
- Stephen Raudenbush, American sociologist and statistician
- Aviad Raz (born 1968), Israeli sociologist and anthropologist
- Luis Recasens, Guatemalan-Spanish-Mexican sociologist
- Mark Regnerus, American sociologist
- Juliette Rennes (born 1976), French sociologist
- Sal Restivo, American sociologist
- John Rex (1925–2011), British sociologist
- James Mahmud Rice (born 1972), Australian sociologist
- Paul Ricoeur, French philosopher
- Cecilia L. Ridgeway, American sociologist
- David Riesman, American sociologist
- George Ritzer (born 1940), American sociologist
- Silvia Rivera Cusicanqui, Bolivian sociologist
- Roland Robertson, British sociologist
- William I. Robinson, American sociologist
- Guy Rocher (1924–2025), Canadian sociologist
- Terje Rød-Larsen (born 1947), Norwegian diplomat and sociologist
- Jesús M. de Miguel Rodríguez (born 1947), Spanish sociologist
- Stein Rokkan, Norwegian sociologist
- Hartmut Rosa, German sociologist
- Arnold Marshall Rose, American sociologist
- Gillian Rose, British sociologist
- Nikolas Rose, British sociologist
- Paul Rosenfels (1909–1985), American psychologist and sociologist
- Eugen Rosenstock-Huessy (1888–1973), German social philosopher
- Jean-Jacques Rousseau, Swiss philosopher
- Peter H. Rossi, American sociologist
- Guenther Roth, German-American sociologist
- Rubén G. Rumbaut, Cuban-American sociologist
- W. G. Runciman, British sociologist
- Arne Runeberg (1912–1979), Finnish sociologist, anthropologist and linguist

== S ==
- Harvey Sacks (died 1975), American sociologist and ethnomethodologist
- Renaud Sainsaulieu (1936–2002), French sociologist concerned with the sociology of organizations
- Henri de Saint-Simon (1760–1825), French philosopher and social thinker
- Patricia Salas O'Brien (born 1958), Peruvian sociologist and Minister of Education
- Robert J. Sampson (born 1956), American sociologist
- Pierre Sansot (1928–2005), French sociologist
- Abdelmalek Sayad (1933–1998), Egyptian-French sociologist
- Andrew Sayer (born 1949), British sociologist
- Boaventura de Sousa Santos (born 1940), Portuguese sociologist
- Giovanni Sartori (1924–2017), Italian political scientist
- Saskia Sassen (born 1949), American sociologist
- Peter Saunders (born 1950), Australian sociologist
- Ferdinand de Saussure (1857–1913), Swiss linguist (structuralism)
- Albert Schäffle (1831–1903), German sociologist
- Thomas J. Scheff (1929–2025), American sociologist
- Emanuel Schegloff (1937–2024), American sociologist
- Max Scheler (1874–1928), German philosopher and founder of the sociology of knowledge
- Helmut Schelsky (1912–1984), German sociologist
- Juraj Schenk (born 1948), Slovak sociologist
- Herbert Schiller (1919–2000), American sociologist
- Kurt C. Schlichting (born 1948), American sociologist
- Wolfgang Schluchter(born 1938), German sociologist
- Sylvia Schmelkes (born 1948), Mexican sociologist
- Paul Schnabel (born 1948), Dutch sociologist
- Allan Schnaiberg (1939–2009), American environmental sociologist
- Juliet Schor (born 1955), American sociologist
- Joseph Alois Schumpeter (1883–1950), Austrian economist
- Alfred Schütz (1899–1959), Austrian philosopher and sociologist (phenomenology)
- Michael Schwartz (born 1942), American sociologist
- John Scott (born 1949), British sociologist
- Sue Scott, British sociologist
- Jean Séguy (1925–2007), French sociologist of religions
- Steven Seidman (born 1948), American sociologist
- Pınar Selek (born 1971), Turkish sociologist
- Philip Selznick (1919–2010), American sociologist
- Amartya Sen (born 1933), Indian economist influential in the sociology of development
- Richard Sennett (born 1943), American sociologist and public figure
- Perla Serfaty (born 1944), Moroccan-born French and Canadian academic, sociologist, psychosociologist, writer
- William H. Sewell (1909–2001), American sociologist
- Steven Shapin (born 1943), American sociologist
- Jeremy J. Shapiro (born 1940), American sociologist
- Ali Shariati (1933–1977), Iranian sociologist and writer
- Tamotsu Shibutani (1920–2004), Japanese-American sociologist
- Bahija Ahmed Shihab (1932–2012), Iraqi sociologist and professor
- Edward Shils (1910–1995), American sociologist
- Anson Shupe (1948–2015), American sociologist
- Volkmar Sigusch (1940–2023), German sociologist and sexuologe
- Charles E. Silberman, American criminologist
- Beverly J. Silver (born 1957), American sociologist
- François Simiand (1873–1935), French sociologist
- Georg Simmel (1858–1918), German sociologist and philosopher
- Herbert A. Simon (1916–2001), American social scientist
- Kirsten Simonsen (born 1946), Danish geographer and sociologist
- Theda Skocpol (born 1947), American sociologist and political scientist
- Beverley Skeggs, British feminist sociologist
- Albion Woodbury Small (1854–1926), American sociologist
- Neil Smelser (1930–2017), American sociologist
- Adam Smith (1723–1790), Scottish economist and philosopher
- Christian Smith (born 1960), American sociologist of religion
- Dorothy E. Smith (born 1926), British/American sociologist and gender theorist
- Stephen C. Smith (born 1968), American sociologist
- Tom Snijders (born 1949), Dutch mathematical sociologist
- David A. Snow (born 1942), American sociologist
- Werner Sombart (1863–1941), German economist and sociologist
- Georges Sorel (1847–1922), French philosopher
- Aage B. Sørensen, Danish-American sociologist
- Bernardo Sorj (born 1948), Brazilian sociologist
- Pitirim Sorokin (1889–1968), Russian sociologist
- Herbert Spencer (1820–1903), English philosopher
- Oswald Spengler (1880–1936), German philosopher
- Lynette Spillman, American sociologist
- Hasso Spode (born 1951), German sociologist and historian
- M. N. Srinivas (1916–1999), Indian sociologist
- Susan Star, American sociologist
- Carl Nicolai Starcke (1858–1926), Danish sociologist
- David C. Stark, American sociologist
- Rodney Stark (1934–2022), American sociologist
- Paul Starr (born 1949), American sociologist
- Rodolfo Stavenhagen (1932–2016), Mexican anthropologist and sociologist
- George Steinmetz (born 1957), American sociologist
- Ana María Díaz Stevens, Puerto Rican-American sociologist
- Samuel A. Stouffer (1900–1960), American sociologist
- Anselm L. Strauss (1916–1996), American sociologist
- Wolfgang Streeck (born 1948), German sociologist
- Sheldon Stryker (1924–2016), American sociologist
- Lucy Suchman (born 1951), American sociologist
- Mark Suchman (born 1960), American sociologist
- Thomas Sugrue (born 1962), American historian and sociologist
- William Graham Sumner (1840–1910), American sociologist
- Eilert Sundt (1817–1875), Norwegian sociologist
- Edwin Sutherland (1893–1950), American criminologist
- Maristella Svampa (born 1961), Argentinian sociologist
- Ian Svenonius, American cultural sociologist
- Richard Swedberg (born 1948), Swedish sociologist
- Ann Swidler (born 1944), American sociologist
- Jan Szczepanski (1913–2004), Polish sociologist
- Iván Szelényi (1938–2026), Hungarian-American sociologist
- Piotr Sztompka (born 1944), Polish sociologist

== T ==
- Hippolyte Taine (1828–1893), French positivist historian and critic
- Yasuma Takada (1883–1972), Japanese sociologist
- Salim Tamari (born 1945), Palestinian historical sociologist
- Lisa Taraki (born 1948), Palestinian sociologist
- Alexander Tarasov (born 1958), Russian sociologist
- Gabriel Tarde (1843–1904), French sociologist and social psychologist
- Sidney Tarrow (born 1938), American sociologist
- R. H. Tawney (1880–1962), English ethical socialist
- Dorceta Taylor, American environmental sociologist
- Ian Taylor (1944–2001), English sociologist and criminologist
- Laurie Taylor (born 1936), English sociologist and broadcaster
- Göran Therborn (born 1941), Swedish-British sociologist
- W. I. Thomas (1863–1947), American social psychologist
- E. P. Thompson (1924–1993), British socialist historian
- John Thompson (1979–2021), British sociologist of culture and media
- Sarah Thornton (born 1965), Canadian sociologist, writer, and ethnographer
- Ole Thyssen (born 1944), Danish sociologist
- Marta Tienda, American sociologist
- Charles Tilly (1929–2008), American sociologist
- Nicholas Timasheff (1886–1970), Russian sociologist
- Valery Tishkov (born 1941), Russian ethnologist and sociologist
- Alexis de Tocqueville (1805–1859), French essayist and political analyst
- Ferdinand Tönnies (1855–1936), German philosopher and founder of German sociology
- Alain Touraine (1925–2023), French sociologist
- Peter Townsend (1928–2009), British sociologist
- Judith Treas (born 1947), American sociologist
- Renato Treves (1907–1992), Italian sociologist
- Ernst Troeltsch (1865–1923), German sociologist and philosopher
- Zeynep Tufekci, Turkish-American sociologist
- Raimo Tuomela (1940–2020), Finnish philosopher and social theorist
- Sherry Turkle (born 1948), American sociologist
- Bryan S. Turner (born 1945), British sociologist
- Jonathan H. Turner (born 1942), American social theorist
- Stephen Park Turner (born 1951), American sociologist
- France Winddance Twine (born 1960), American sociologist and ethnographer

== U ==
- John Urry (1946–2016), British sociologist

== V ==
- Mariana Valverde, Canadian sociologist
- Joseph A. Varacalli (born 1952), American sociologist
- Francisco Varela (1946–2001), Chilean biologist and philosopher
- Aninhalli Vasavi (born 1958), Indian sociologist
- Diane Vaughan, American sociologist
- Thorstein Veblen (1857–1929), American sociologist and economist
- Ruut Veenhoven (1942–2024), Dutch sociologist
- Calvin Veltman (born 1941), Canadian sociologist, demographer and sociolinguist
- Sudhir Alladi Venkatesh (born 1966), American sociologist
- Eliseo Verón (1935–2014), Argentinian sociologist
- Alfred Vierkandt (1867–1953), German sociologist
- Marika Vila (born 1949), Spanish comics artist and writer; feminist sociologist
- George Edgar Vincent (1864–1941), American sociologist
- Paul Virilio (1932–2018), French philosopher and social theorist
- Shiv Visvanathan, Indian sociologist and social scientist

== W ==
- Loïc Wacquant (born 19600, French sociologist
- Peter Wagner, German sociologist and social theorist
- Linda Waite, American sociologist
- Judy Wajcman, British sociologist
- Sylvia Walby, British sociologist
- Immanuel Wallerstein (1930–2019), American sociologist and historian
- Margit Warburg (born 1952), Danish sociologist
- Lester Frank Ward (1841–1913), founder of American sociology
- Vron Ware, British educator and journalist
- Mary C. Waters (born 19570, American sociologist
- Duncan Watts (born 1971), American mathematical sociologist and network theorist
- Emile Waxweiler (1867–1916), Belgian sociologist
- Beatrice Webb (1858–1943), British socialist and social theorist
- Sidney Webb (1859–1947), British socialist and social theorist
- Alfred Weber (1868–1958), German sociologist
- Marianne Weber (1870–1954), German sociologist
- Max Weber (1864–1920), German sociologist
- Frank Webster (born 1950), British sociologist
- Margaret Weir (born 1952), sociologist and political scientist
- Barry Wellman (born 1942), Canadian/American sociologist
- Ida B. Wells-Barnett (1862–1931), American sociologist, journalist, social worker
- John Westergaard (1931–2003), British sociologist
- Edvard Westermarck (1862–1939), Finnish sociologist and philosopher
- Nathan Whetten (1900–1984), American sociologist and academic administrator
- Douglas R. White (1942–2021), American mathematical sociologist and anthropologist
- Harrison White (1930–2024), American sociologist
- William Foote Whyte (1914–2000), American sociologist
- William H. Whyte (1917–1999), American sociologist, journalist and peoplewatcher
- Saskia Wieringa (born in 1950), Dutch sociologist and professor
- Leopold von Wiese (1876–1969), German sociologist
- Michel Wieviorka (born 1946), French sociologist
- Jean-Paul Willaime (born 1947), French sociologist of religions
- Sidney M. Willhelm (1934–2018), American sociologist, author
- Raymond Williams (1921–1988), British sociologist, novelist, and critic
- Paul Willis (born 1945), British sociologist and social scientist
- Helmut Willke (1945–2024), German sociologist
- William Julius Wilson (born 1935), American sociologist
- Howard Winant (born 1946), American sociologist
- Christopher Winship (born 19500, American sociologist
- Louis Wirth (1897–1952), German/American sociologist
- Edmund Wnuk-Lipinski (1944–2015), Polish sociologist
- José Woldenberg (born 1952), Mexican sociologist
- Mary Wollstonecraft (1759–1797), British social reformer
- Steve Woolgar (born 1950), British sociologist
- Monroe Work (1866–1945), American sociologist
- Cas Wouters (1943–2025), Dutch sociologist
- Erik Olin Wright (1947–2019), American sociologist
- Robert Wuthnow (born 1946), American sociologist

== Y ==
- Lewis Yablonsky (1924–2014), American sociologist
- Kazuo Yamaguchi, Japanese sociologist, Department of Sociology, University of Chicago
- Masahiro Yamada, Japanese sociologist
- Hajar Yazdiha (born 1983), American sociologist
- John Milton Yinger (1916–2011), American sociologist, president of the American Sociological Association 1976–1977
- Paul Yonnet (1948–2011), French sociologist
- Michael Young (1915–2002), British sociologist and Labour politician
- Wayland Young (1923–2009), British historian, social thinker and Labour politician

== Z ==
- Benjamin Zablocki (1941–2020), American sociologist and social psychologist
- Mayer Zald (1931–2012), American sociologist
- Tatyana Zaslavskaya (1927–2013), Russian sociologist
- René Zavaleta Mercado (1935–1984), Bolivian sociologist
- Hans Zeisel (1905–1992), Austrian-American sociologist
- Viviana Zelizer (born 1946), Argentinian sociologist
- Eviatar Zerubavel (born 1948), American cognitive sociologist
- Jean Ziegler (1934–2026), Swiss sociologist
- Carle C. Zimmerman (1897–1983), American sociologist
- Florian Znaniecki (1882–1958), Polish/American sociologist
- Irving Zola (1935–1994), American medical sociologist and disability rights activist
- Tukufu Zuberi (born 1959), American sociologist
- Harriet Zuckerman (born 1937), American sociologist, specializes in science
- Sharon Zukin, American sociologist
- Phil Zuckerman, American sociologist
