= Ana Díaz =

Ana Díaz may refer to:

- Ana Díaz (Mexican singer) (born 1972), Mexican composer and singer
- Ana Diaz (Swedish singer) (born 1977), Swedish singer, composer and music producer
- Ana Díaz (volleyball) (born 1954), Cuban volleyball player
- Ana Mae Díaz (born 1967), First Lady of Panama
- Ana Díaz (footballer) (born 2002), American-raised Puerto Rican footballer
- Ana María Díaz Stevens, Puerto Rican-American sociologist
- Ana Díaz (Buenos Aires Premetro), a Buenos Aires Premetro station
