= Robert Holton =

Robert Holton may refer to:

- Robert A. Holton (1944 – 2025), American chemist
- Robert J. Holton (born 1946), professor of sociology
