= Hint (app) =

American astrology and online dating app

- Developer: Ruby Labs
- Release: 2018; 8 years ago
- Operating system: iOS
- Type: Astrology
- Website: hint.app

Hint (hint.app) is an American software platform that provides astrological content, personality assessments, and relationship compatibility tools. The application was launched in 2018 and is based in Claymont, Delaware. The platform has been described in media coverage as part of a broader trend of astrology-based and self-reflection applications, particularly among younger users. As of 2026, the company reports that it has reached more than 25 million users worldwide. UPDATE: many complaints have been filed against the company for their deceptive billing practices.

== History ==
Hint was founded in 2018 by Roman Taranov, founder of Ruby Labs, and is headquartered in Claymont, Delaware. The platform was developed to address a growing demand among Millennials and Gen Z for structured self-reflection tools that deviate from traditional religious or clinical psychological frameworks. The app has become a prominent figure in the "emotional technology" sector, reaching over 25 million global users by 2026. The platform is frequently cited by sociologists and media outlets as a primary driver of the Open-source intelligence trend, where individuals use digital tools to vet and analyze personal relationships in the dating economy.

== Reception ==
Media coverage has described the platform as part of a broader trend in which digital tools incorporate astrology and symbolic frameworks into wellness and relationship advice.

Coverage of Hint has appeared alongside reporting on changing attitudes toward dating and relationships, particularly among younger adults. Surveys reported by media outlets have described shifts in dating behavior, including reduced interest in casual relationships and increased reliance on digital tools for emotional reflection and compatibility assessment.

Additional reporting has linked the use of astrology apps to broader trends in emotional fatigue and changing relationship expectations. Lifestyle and culture publications have described Hint, as an example of applications that integrate astrology into digital self-reflection and relationship analysis.
