= Muriel Darmon =

French sociologist (born 1973)

- Born: February 22, 1973 (age 53)
- Citizenship: France
- Education: University of Paris 5
- Occupation: Sociologist
- Employer(s): National Center for Scientific Research; School for Advanced Studies in the Social Sciences

Muriel Darmon (born February 22, 1973) is a French sociologist. She is a director of research with the French National Centre for Scientific Research (CRNS) and has been affiliated with the Center for European sociologie and political science (CESSP) at the School for Advanced Studies in the Social Sciences (EHESS) since 2012. Her work deals with processed of socialization and the production of habitus, especially as related to youth, the body and health. Since 2017, she has been the president of the French Sociological Association.

== Research ==
Darmon is the author of Devenir anorexique: Une approche sociologique, published by La Découverte in 2003 and in English translation by Routledge in 2016 as Becoming anorexic. A sociological study. In it she examines anorexia as a social process rather than a strictly psychiatric one. The book was based on work begun during her doctoral research; she defended her thesis, “Approche sociologique de l'anorexie : un travail de soi” (transl. "Sociological approach to anorexia: a work of the self"), in 2001 under the direction of François de Singly at the University of Paris 5. While pursuing her fieldwork, Darmon ran into difficulties accessing a psychiatric hospital for her research. She ultimately described this in her article, “La sociologue, le psychiatre et le boulangère : analyse d'un refus de terrain” (transl. ”The sociologist, the psychiatrist and the baker: analysis of a refusal in fieldwork”), after the head doctor of a hospital rejected Darmon's request for interviews by saying sociologists had no more to say about anorexia than bakers did: “It’s simple: [anorexics] don’t eat bread.”

In 2015, Darmon published Classes préparatoires : La fabrique d’une jeunesse dominante. The book is an ethnographic study of the preparatory classes, the two years of post-high school study that elite French students take before the competitive entrance exams for the grandes écoles (a parallel system to the open enrollment at most of France's public universities). Over the course of two years of fieldwork, Darmon conducted 100 interviews and spent 100 hours of observation in two prépas, one for science and the other economic, at what she describes as an “intermediary” school situated between Paris's best-known high schools and the smaller provincial schools. On the basis of this material, Darmon, following the sociological tradition of Pierre Bourdieu, analyzed the power structures that come to define the students’ identities over course of their time in these classes: what habitus, and thus, types of selves, these schools produce.
