= Giladi =

Giladi or Gileadi is a Jewish surname. Notable people with the surname include:

== Giladi ==
- Ayelet Giladi (born 1964), Israeli educational sociologist
- Daniel Giladi, Israeli Paralympic swimmer and volleyball player
- Eliyahu Giladi (1915–1943), Irgun and Lehi fighter
- Moti Giladi (born 1946), Israeli singer and actor
- Naeim Giladi (1926–2010), Iraqi author

== Gileadi ==
- Aviva Gileadi (1917–2001), Israeli nuclear scientist
- Avraham Gileadi (born 1940), Dutch-born American scholar and professor
