= Samuel R. Friedman =

American sociologist (born 1942)

- Born: Samuel Robert Friedman; 1942 (age 83–84)
- Citizenship: American
- Education: Harvard College (BA); University of Michigan (MA, PhD)
- Known for: HIV/AIDS research among people who inject drugs, harm reduction, social network theory, Big Events framework
- Awards: International Rolleston Award (2009); NIDA Avant Garde Award (2012)
- Scientific career
- Fields: Sociology, epidemiology, public health
- Workplaces: NYU Grossman School of Medicine; National Development and Research Institutes

Samuel Robert Friedman (born 1942) is an American sociologist, epidemiologist, public health researcher, social activist, and poet. He is a professor in the Department of Population Health at the NYU Grossman School of Medicine. Friedman is known for his research on HIV/AIDS among people who inject drugs (PWID), harm reduction, social network theory, and the structural determinants of infectious disease epidemics.

As of 2026, his work has garnered over 40,000 citations with an h-index exceeding 100, according to Google Scholar.

== Early life and education ==
Friedman was raised in Washington, D.C., to a Jewish-American family. He attended Woodrow Wilson High School, graduating in 1960. He received a Bachelor of Arts degree magna cum laude in Economics from Harvard College in 1964. He then attended the University of Michigan, where he earned both a Master of Arts and a Doctor of Philosophy in Sociology, with a major field in Social Organization and a minor in Mathematical Sociology, completing his doctorate in 1970.

== Academic and research career ==
Friedman served as Acting Assistant Professor and then Assistant Professor of Sociology at UCLA from 1968 to 1974, followed by positions at Montclair State College (1974–1976), American University (1976–1977), and SUNY College at Old Westbury (1977–1979). He worked as a consultant to organizations including the United Nations Industrial Development Organization and the U.S. Department of Housing and Urban Development (1979–1980), and as a Senior Research Associate at the Vera Institute of Justice (1981–1983).

From 1983 to 2019, Friedman worked at National Development and Research Institutes, Inc. (NDRI), where he became Director of the Institute for Infectious Disease Research. Since 2019, he has been a professor in the Department of Population Health at the NYU Grossman School of Medicine.

During the 1960s and 1970s, he was involved in actions against racism, the Vietnam War, South African apartheid, and in support of women's liberation, gay liberation, and rank-and-file union power. He later led a successful effort to organize a union at the National Development and Research Institutes. After the destruction of the World Trade Center in 2001, where NDRI had offices, Friedman became active in anti-war movements opposing the invasions of Afghanistan and Iraq.

== Research contributions ==
=== HIV/AIDS and injection drug use ===
Friedman is among the pioneers of HIV/AIDS research among people who inject drugs. Beginning in the mid-1980s, he was among the first researchers to document the severity and trajectory of the HIV epidemic in this population in New York City and internationally. His early work with Don C. Des Jarlais at Beth Israel Medical Center helped establish the epidemiological foundation for understanding HIV transmission among injecting drug users.

He has conducted extensive research on social networks and HIV risk, demonstrating how network structure including "sociometric risk networks" shapes HIV transmission probabilities independently of individual behavior. This work contributed to the development of network-based HIV prevention interventions.

=== Harm reduction ===
Friedman co-authored foundational papers on syringe exchange programs and their role in reducing HIV transmission. His 2001 paper Harm reduction - a historical view from the left situated harm reduction within a broader tradition of progressive social movements. He delivered the First Rolleston Banquet Oration at the 7th International Conference on the Reduction of Drug Related Harm in Paris in 1997.

=== Big Events framework ===
Together with colleagues, Friedman developed the "Big Events" theoretical framework, which examines how large-scale social disruptions like wars, economic crises, natural disasters, pandemics affect drug use, HIV epidemics, and community vulnerability. This framework has been applied to contexts ranging from the Greek financial crisis to the war in Ukraine.

== Awards and honors ==
- International Rolleston Award, Harm Reduction International (2009)
- NIDA Avant Garde Award, National Institute on Drug Abuse (2012–2017), for research on preventing HIV transmission by recently-infected drug users
- Sociology AIDS Network Award for Career Contributions to the Sociology of HIV/AIDS (2007; inaugural recipient)
- Lifetime Contribution Award, Association of Black Sociologists (2005)
- Senior Scholar Award, Drinking & Drugs Division, Society for the Study of Social Problems (2021)
- Praxis Award, Marxist Sociology Section, American Sociological Association (2020)
- Senior Scholar Award, Alcohol, Drugs, and Tobacco Section, American Sociological Association (2010)

== Bibliography ==
=== Selected books ===
- Friedman, Samuel R. (1982). Teamster Rank and File: Power, Bureaucracy and Rebellion at Work. Columbia University Press. ISBN 978-0-231-05372-3. (Second edition 2026, Routledge)
- Friedman, Samuel R.; Lipton, Douglas S., eds. (1991). Cocaine, AIDS, and Intravenous Drug Use. Haworth Press. ISBN 978-1-56024-147-8.
- Friedman, Samuel R.; Curtis, Richard; Neaigus, Alan; Jose, Benny; Des Jarlais, Don C. (1999). Social Networks, Drug Injectors' Lives, and HIV/AIDS. Kluwer/Plenum. ISBN 978-0-306-46170-5.
- Institute of Medicine Committee on Lesbian Health Research Priorities (1999). Lesbian Health: Current Assessment and Directions for the Future. National Academy Press. ISBN 978-0-309-06567-2. (Friedman was a contributing committee member)
- Friedman, Samuel R. (2008). Seeking to Make the World Anew: Poems of the Living Dialectic. Hamilton Books. ISBN 978-0-7618-4067-1.

== Personal life ==
Friedman is the son of Melvin Hilliard Friedman and Beatrice P. (née Zisman) Friedman. He married Judith Johnson, a fellow sociology graduate student, in Ann Arbor in 1966. Judith Friedman became a sociology professor at the University of Southern California and later at Rutgers University. Their daughter, Catherine R. Friedman, is a psychiatrist.
