= Yasmin Jiwani =

- Education: University of British Columbia (B.A.); Simon Fraser University (M.A.), (PhD)
- Occupation(s): professor, author, activist

Yasmin Jiwani is a feminist academic and activist. In her research, she examines the intersectionality of race and gender in media narratives of violence against women and representations of racialized peoples. Currently, Dr. Jiwani is a full professor in the Department of Communication Studies at Concordia University in Montreal, Quebec. She is the author of Discourses of Denial: Mediations of Race, Gender and Violence.

== Education ==
In 1979, Jiwani graduated from University of British Columbia with a Bachelor of Arts in psychology. In 1983, she attained her master's degree in sociology from Simon Fraser University. Her thesis topic was entitled “The Forms of Jah: The Mystic Collectivity of the Rastafarians.” In 1988, Jiwani received a certificate from the Summer Institute for Semiotic and Structural Studies from UBC. Four years later, she also obtained a certificate from the New Initiatives in Film & Video Program, Studio D, from the National Film Board of Canada in Montreal, Canada. In 1993, Jiwani completed a PhD in communication studies at Simon Fraser. Her doctoral dissertation was entitled “By Omission and Commission: ‘Race’ and Representation in Canadian Television News.”

== Work Experience ==
=== Academic career ===
From 1978 to 1980, Jiwani was a teaching assistant (TA) in the Department of Psychology at UBC. For the next few years, she worked as a TA and guest lecturer at both Simon Fraser and McMaster University. From 1986 to 1988, Jiwani became a sessional instructor in the School of Communication at SFU. From 1995 to 1998, Jiwani became a lecturer in Women's Studies at UBC. In addition, she was a research scholar for the Centre for Research in Women's Studies and Gender Relations. From 1997 to 2001, Jiwani worked as an adjunct professor at Simon Fraser in the School of Criminology.

Since 2003, she has been a research fellow at the Simone de Beauvoir Institute at Concordia University. In addition, Jiwani is an academic research associate for the Centre for Research & Education on Violence Against Women & Children at University of Western Ontario. From 2001 to 2005, Jiwani was an assistant professor in Communication Studies at Concordia. From 2005 to 2012, she became an associate professor in the same department. In 2012, Jiwani was made a full professor. In 2017, Jiwani became the Concordia University Research Chair in Intersectionality, Violence and Resistance.

== Other work experience ==
From 1989 to 1990, Jiwani worked as the communications director for the In Visible Colours International Film and Video Society. For the next year, she was the Ethnic Liaison Officer for Canada's national statistical agency, Statistics Canada, in the Pacific Region. From 1991 to 1994, Jiwani was the Coordinator of the Women's Program at the National Film Board of Canada.

== Bibliography ==
=== Books ===
- Berman, Helene and Yasmin Jiwani, eds. Faces of Violence in the Lives of Girls. London: Althouse Press, 2014. ISBN 978-0-920354-77-3
- Jiwani, Yasmin. Discourses of Denial: Mediations of Race, Gender and Violence. Vancouver: UBC Press, 2006. ISBN 978-0774812375
- Jiwani, Yasmin, Candis Steenbergen, and Claudia Mitchell, eds. Girlhood: Redefining the Limits. Montreal: Black Rose Books, 2006. ISBN 978-1551642765
