= Paul Yonnet =

French Sociologist

Paul Yonnet (14 January 1948 – 19 August 2011) was a French sociologist who specialised in the study of leisure, sport and fashion.

== Life and work ==
Paul Yonnet was born on 14 January 1948. He was trained in sociology at the University of Caen Normandy. In his book Jeux, modes et masses (1985), he analyzed social transformations through the study of subjects such as equestrianism, jogging and football.

Yonnet's 1993 book Voyage au centre du malaise français. L'Antiracisme et le roman national was widely discussed upon publication. In the book, he scrutinized the antiracist organization SOS Racisme and its impact on French culture, arguing that antiracism is a symptom of lost "proletarian hope" and constitutes a "substitute utopia".

Yonnet's last book was the posthumously published Zone de mort (2017), in which he used literature, introspection and philosophy to reflect on human life and mortality. Alexandre Devecchio of Le Figaro Magazine called it "a powerful meditation on the tragedy of the human condition". Yonnet died after a long time's illness on 19 August 2011, at the age of 63.
