= Darnell Hawkins =

American sociologist and criminologist

Darnell Felix Hawkins (born November 24, 1946) is an American sociologist and criminologist. He is emeritus professor of African-American studies, sociology, and criminal justice at the University of Illinois at Chicago. He is known for his research on racial differences in crime, the ways in which the law is applied differently across races, and violence prevention. This includes research on urban violence and racial profiling.

== Biography ==
Hawkins received his B.A. from Kansas State University in 1968, his M.A.T. from Wayne State University in 1970, his A.M. and Ph.D. from the University of Michigan in 1974 and 1976, respectively, and his J.D. from the University of North Carolina at Chapel Hill in 1981. He was a professor at UIC from 1987 until his retirement from there in 2002.
