= Jesús M. de Miguel Rodríguez =

Sociologist

Jesús M. de Miguel Rodríguez (born 1947) is a sociologist and professor of sociology at the University of Barcelona where he is director of the sociological research group GRS. He is also the representative for Spain on the committee of Social Sciences of the European Cooperation in the Field of Scientific and Technical Research at the European Commission.

Rodríguez has been a researcher at Yale University, Stanford University, University of California, San Diego, University of Maryland, College Park, University of Arizona, University of Adelaide, and Hosei University. He has been editor of Social Science and Medicine, and has sat on the editorial board of Health Promotion, Health for All in Europe, and Contemporary Sociology. He was chair of Estudios Españoles Príncipe de Asturias in Georgetown University, Washington DC.

Rodríguez has received ten national awards including the Premio Nacional de Investigación en Ciencias Sociales in 1982, two first prizes in the "Premio de Ensayo" of the Basque Country and the international award "Prince of Asturias Chair" in 1999.

Rodríguez earned a doctorate in political sciences from Complutense University and a PhD in sociology from Yale University.

He has been repeatedly accused by students and colleagues of professional misconduct and sexual abuses, but never brought to trial because of the legal prescription of the acts he was accused of.

== Selected bibliography ==
Rodríguez has published more than fifty books and nearly one hundred and fifty professional articles both in Spanish and English.

- de Miguel, Jesús M; Moyer, Melissa G (1979), Sociology in Spain, Current sociology (Paris, France), v. 27, no. 1, Sage Publications, OCLC 7170017
- de Miguel, Jesús M; Díez Nicolás, Juan (1985), Políticas de población, Espasa universitaria; Sociología; 24 (in Spanish), Espasa-Calpe, ISBN 978-84-239-6524-3
- de Miguel, Jesús M (1990), El mito de la sociedad organizada, Historia, ciencia y sociedad, 221., Ediciones Península, ISBN 978-84-297-3156-9
- de Miguel, Jesús M (1998), Estructura y cambio social en España, El libro universitario, Manuales : ciencias sociales, 2 (in Spanish), Alianza editorial, ISBN 978-84-206-8171-9
- de Miguel, Jesús M; Caïs, Jordi; Vaquera, Elizabeth (2001), Excelencia : calidad de las universidades españolas, Colección Academia (Centro de Investigaciones Sociológicas), Centro de Investigaciones Sociológicas, ISBN 978-84-7476-313-3
- de Miguel, Jesús M; Pinto, Carmelo (2002), Sociología visual, Colección Monografías (Centro de Investigaciones Sociológicas), no. 186., Centro de Investigaciones Sociológicas, ISBN 978-84-7476-329-4
