= Orna Donath =

Israeli sociologist, researcher of Voluntary childlessness

Orna Donath אורנה דונת
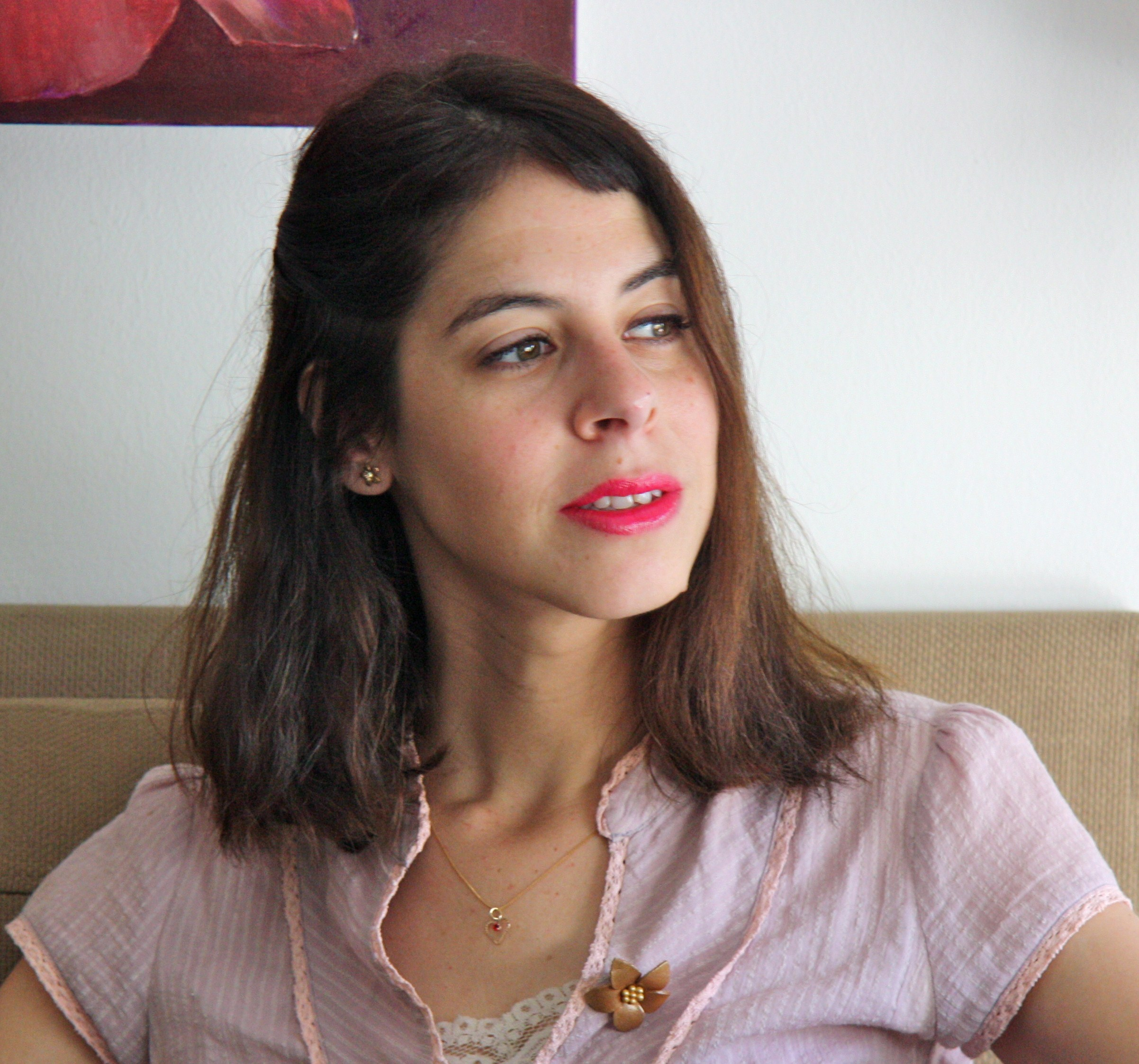
- Born: Orna Donath; October 15, 1976; Ramat Ha-Sharon, Tel Aviv District, Israel
- Education: Tel Aviv University
- Occupations: Sociologist, lecturer, writer
- Known for: Activism in feminism
- Notable work: Mimeni VaHal'a: Bhira Behaim Bli Yeladim BeYisrael (2011); Regretting Motherhood: A Study (2017)

Orna Donath (Hebrew: אורנה דונת; born October 15, 1976) is an Israeli sociologist, lecturer, writer and feminist activist. She teaches at Tel Aviv University, Ben Gurion University, and the Academic College of Tel Aviv-Yafo. Her field of study focuses on the social expectations projected on women, both those who are mothers and those who are not, especially by choice.

== Biography ==
Donath was born in Ramat Hasharon, the second of two daughters. Her mother works in computers, and her father is a business consultant. She completed her MA in sociology and anthropology at Tel Aviv University in 2007. Her thesis dealt with voluntary childlessness in the very pro-natal Israeli society. She continued on to complete her PhD at Tel Aviv University, on the topic of regretting motherhood. Both works of research were adapted into books: Regretting Motherhood (2017), and Mimeni VaHal'a: Bhira Behaim Bli Yeladim BeYisrael (Not my thing: The choice to live without children in Israel ממני והלאה: בחירה בחיים בלי ילדים בישראל; Hakibbutz Hameuchad 2011). After her PhD, Donath continued with a post-doc appointment at Ben Gurion University, at the Center for Women's Studies and Advancement.

When Mimeni VaHal'a came out in 2011, it was the first research of its kind done in Israel. The study undermined one of the most cherished myths of Israeli society - that having children is a matter of destiny, not choice. Donath analyzed women's choices to not have children using both sociological and anthropological lenses, with the goal of explaining this choice in an accessible way. In the book, she provides an overview of the history of human procreation and how procreation is controlled and directed by those in power. She also reviews the concept of childhood, and how it has developed over time, and concludes that in Israel, in spite of various changes in the concept and structure of family, childlessness remains a choice that carries great stigma, and there is a long way to go before the choice to not have children is viewed as legitimate. A major distinction Donath insisted upon in her work was between voluntary childlessness and "life without children", pointing out that the two are not the same thing, while also distinguishing the choice from antinatalism, which is a philosophical or ideological objection to procreation, by anyone, and not simply a personal choice that can be made for a variety of reasons.

Donath's second book, Regretting Motherhood, examines the attitudes of women from various backgrounds regarding child-rearing, both before and after they had children. The book collects the stories of 23 women talking about motherhood from a very personal place, and about their regret about becoming mothers, though they love and feel responsible for their children. In addition to bringing the individual perspective on a topic that is taboo in Israel, Donath examines commonly held attitudes about motherhood, procreation, parenting, and more, and concludes that feeling regret about becoming a mother does not mean lacking skill or commitment as a parent. She wishes to undermine the socially accepted idea that being a woman inherently includes motherhood, and claims that pushing women in motherhood can cause them great suffering. Donath discusses the pressures placed on women, whose choices are seen as a threat to the status quo.

The book received international attention, causing a storm when an interview with her was published in a German academic journal, and sparking a methodical discourse never before conducted in Israel or elsewhere. It has since been translated into multiple languages and published in many countries, including Taiwan, South Korea, Spain, Italy, Germany, France, the UK and the United States.

In addition to her academic work, Donath has held several roles at the Hasharon rape crisis center, including education coordinator, course developer, and chairperson of the association.

== Works ==
Books

- Mimeni VaHal'a: Bhira Behaim Bli Yeladim BeYisrael (Not my thing: The choice to live without children in Israel) (Hakibbutz Hameuchad (in Hebrew)) (2011)
- Regretting Motherhood: A Study (Yedioth Aharonoth (in Hebrew)) (2017)

Articles

- Donath, Orna (2015-11-01). "Choosing motherhood? Agency and regret within reproduction and mothering retrospective accounts". Women's Studies International Forum. 53: 200–209. doi:10.1016/j.wsif.2014.10.023. ISSN 0277-5395.
- Donath, Orna (2015-01-01). "Regretting Motherhood: A Sociopolitical Analysis". Signs: Journal of Women in Culture and Society. 40 (2): 343–367. doi:10.1086/678145. ISSN 0097-9740.
