= Carl J. Couch =

American sociologist

Carl J. Couch (June 9, 1925 – September 15, 1994) a noted American sociologist, was the founder of the New Iowa School of Symbolic Interaction. He was also one of the founders of Society for the Study of Symbolic Interaction. Couch's key areas of scholarship include symbolic interactionism, New Iowa School of laboratory research, as well as information technologies. With the breadth of his works, Couch influenced researchers in various fields including sociology, communication, education, business, psychology, etc.

Couch's thoughts were influenced by George Herbert Mead who was credited with the foundational elements of symbolic interactionism. While Mead focused his attention on answering the question, “How is society possible?”, Couch devoted his discussion to answer the question, “How is social interaction possible?” Dyadic interaction was the focus of attention in Couch's scholarship. In addition, Couch emphasized the importance of temporal structures in social interaction. He was committed in observing how two or more individuals begin, maintain, and complete an act in any social context.

Symbolic Interactionism

Couch was an influential scholar in symbolic interactionism, a theoretical approach that emphasized the agency of individuals in meaning making and reality creation. Couch, like other symbolic interactionists, rejected the idea that reality was readily made, rather, he believed that reality was constantly in the making via social interaction. Couch denounced the traditional positivistic model where human action was understood as responses to stimuli. Couch believed that humans engage in reflexive thinking, and do not simply react to basic instinct.

When discussing reflexive thinking, Couch identified four stages of socialization that transformed an infant to a human being, which included significant gestures, significant symbols, consciousness of self and consciousness of social structures. Couch also examined the sensory modes where individuals used to acquire information about their environment which included touch, discourse and appearance. Couch emphasized the importance of temporal structures in human action, and argued that human action was informed by the past, and structured by a projected future. In studying social acts, Couch provided anatomies of interpersonal accountability, bargaining and negotiation. Couch further extrapolated on the construction of social relationships including, parental, solidary, accountable, authoritative, romantic, exchanging, charismatic, tyrannical and representative relationships. Couch's examinations of social processes and relationships are a constant diet for students in communication and sociology.

New Iowa School

Couch and associates designed a laboratory research to study social processes, utilizing audio video recording, known as the New Iowa School of Symbolic Interaction. Couch advocated the use of laboratory as it eliminates extraneous factors, and brings the research phenomena into focus. The laboratory as a controlled setting eliminates the interferences of unrelated factors that complicate the phenomena under examination. The laboratory setting magnifies selected features of social life and highlights the phenomena under investigation.

An important principle of Couch's laboratory approach is to treat participants as intelligent agents who are able to anticipate, access each other's intention, and act with intentionality. This emphasis on the reflexive thinking and willful acts of participants distinguishes Couch's approach from traditional laboratory research where human subjects were only allowed to respond to stimuli, and not to interact. Based on this conception of participants, Couch instructed laboratory researchers to establish a context, assign identities, and provide a social objective for participants to interact in the laboratory. The context established is artificial in the way that it is created by the researcher to elicit the kind of social relationship under examination.

In the laboratory, Couch instructed researchers to assign participants identities congruent to the context established. Couch advised that it is desirable to assign identities that are consistent or compatible with participants’ everyday identities. Individuals who align themselves with the management are assigned to play the managers, whereas people who are sympathetic to labor are assigned to play union leaders, in a research of workplace negotiation. The advantages of doing so include allowing participants to become more firmly situated in the context created, and also to have a better vocabulary for the enactment of identities assigned.

A distinct advantage of using audio-visual recording to study social interaction in the laboratory, according to Couch, is the ability of researchers to study social processes with precision. To study social processes requires researchers to describe the sequence of social interaction. It requires noting the sequential order of social events and specifying their formal qualities as well as their quantities.

Couch noted that there is a general lack of attention to sequential order by naturalistic observers in their reports. The recording and play-back capacities of the video recording allow laboratory researchers to obtain a complete record of data, and examine the data over and over again to specify the sequences of social acts with precision. To be able to specify the sequential order of social acts requires the researchers to prepare the data for analysis by transcribing the video recordings.

Information Technologies

Couch believed that information technologies and social structures are complexly interwoven, and emphasized the importance to examine the reciprocal relationships between information technologies and social structures. Couch's works which span from ancient oralities, writing systems, printing, to broadcasting and the Internet, demonstrate how information technologies impact on social structures, and how social structures dictate technological changes.

Couch argued that information technologies are not neutral elements in the process of communication, and that different technological forms have consequences for forms of human experiences and social associations. Couch noted that media of communication have impacts on human experiences, independent of the content. However, he also stated that the interaction of the individuals and the overall social structures shape the effects of information technologies. Couch indicated that media per se does not produce or maintain social relationships. He believed that a more promising approach is to attempt to specify the interactive relationships among information, information technologies, and social relationships.

Adopting a symbolic interactionist approach, Couch conceptualized information technologies as objects used by willful human agent in social interaction. He then provided analyses of media as contextualized by various social relationships to demonstrate how the information technologies shape, and are shaped by social structures.

Current and Future Applications

Couch's works on symbolic interactionism have inspired his students to publish volumes on various topics including opening, temporal structure, patient-physician relationships ...etc. Couch's works on laboratory research have informed research on negotiation, parent-child relationships ...etc. His works on information technologies have guided researchers in their studies of fan clubs, Walkman listening, eBay activities, and Usenet structures ...etc.

Directions have been specified to apply the principles of Couch's New Iowa School of symbolic interaction to study social media, such as Second Life. It is noted that the ethos, methodological mission, and theoretical standpoint of the New Iowa School, provide a useful framework for studying Second Life, a three dimensional virtual world.

The Society for the Study of Symbolic Interactionism sponsors an annual Couch-Stone meeting named in honor of Couch and another noted symbolic interactionist, Gregory Stone.

The Carl Couch Center for Social and Internet Research is a non-profit organization established to promote scholarship in sociological and communication questions. It grants the Carl J. Couch Internet Research Award each year.

== Selected publications ==
- "Collective Behavior:Examining Some Stereotypes" (1968) "Social Problems" 15:310-322.
- Constructing Civilizations (1984)
- Researching Social Processes in the Laboratory (1987)
- Studies in Symbolic Interactionsism (with others, 1987
- Social Processes and Relationships: A Formal Approach (1988)
- "You just might get it right one day." On being informed. Symbolic Interaction, 1995, 18(3), 225–228.
- Information Technologies and Social Orders (with others, 1996) Second edition, 2017.
- Communication and Social Structure(with others).
- On the indispenability of communication for understanding social relationships and social structures (with D. Maines). Communication and social Structure.
- Constructing Social Life. (ed. with R. Hintz)). (1975)
- Recording Social Interaction (with S. Saxton). Chapter in C.Couch and R. Hintz, eds.) Constructing Social Life. (1975).
- Self-Attitudes and Degree of Agreement with Immediate Others. American Journal of Sociology (1958).
- Writing and Reading as Social Activities (with R. Hintz). Sociological Quarterly (1973).
- "Oral Technologies: A Cornerstone of Ancient Civilizations?" Sociological Quarterly. (1989).
- Presidential Address: Let Us Rekindle the Passion by Constructing a Robust Science of the Social. Sociological quarterly (1995).
- Symbolic Interaction, Vol. 18, No. 3, Essays in Honor of Carl J. Couch (Fall 1995).
- Studies in Symbolic Interaction, Supplement 3, Constructing Complexity: Symbolic Interaction and Social Forms (1997).
- Studies in Symbolic Interaction, Vol. 49, Carl J. Couch and the Iowa School, In His Own Words and In Reflection (2017).
