= Faculties and schools of the University of British Columbia =

The University of British Columbia (UBC) is a Canadian public research university with campuses in Vancouver and Kelowna, British Columbia. The following is a list of faculties and schools at UBC.

== UBC Vancouver ==
- Faculty of Applied Science
  - Engineering
    - School of Biomedical Engineering
    - Department of Chemical and Biological Engineering
    - Clean Energy Engineering
    - Department of Civil Engineering
    - Department of Electrical Engineering and Computer Engineering
    - Engineering Physics
    - Environmental Engineering
    - Geological Engineering
    - Integrated Engineering
    - Department of Materials Engineering
    - Department of Mechanical Engineering
    - Keevil Institute of Mining Engineering
    - Manufacturing Engineering
  - School of Architecture and Landscape Architecture
  - School of Community and Regional Planning
  - MacIsaac School of Nursing
- Faculty of Arts
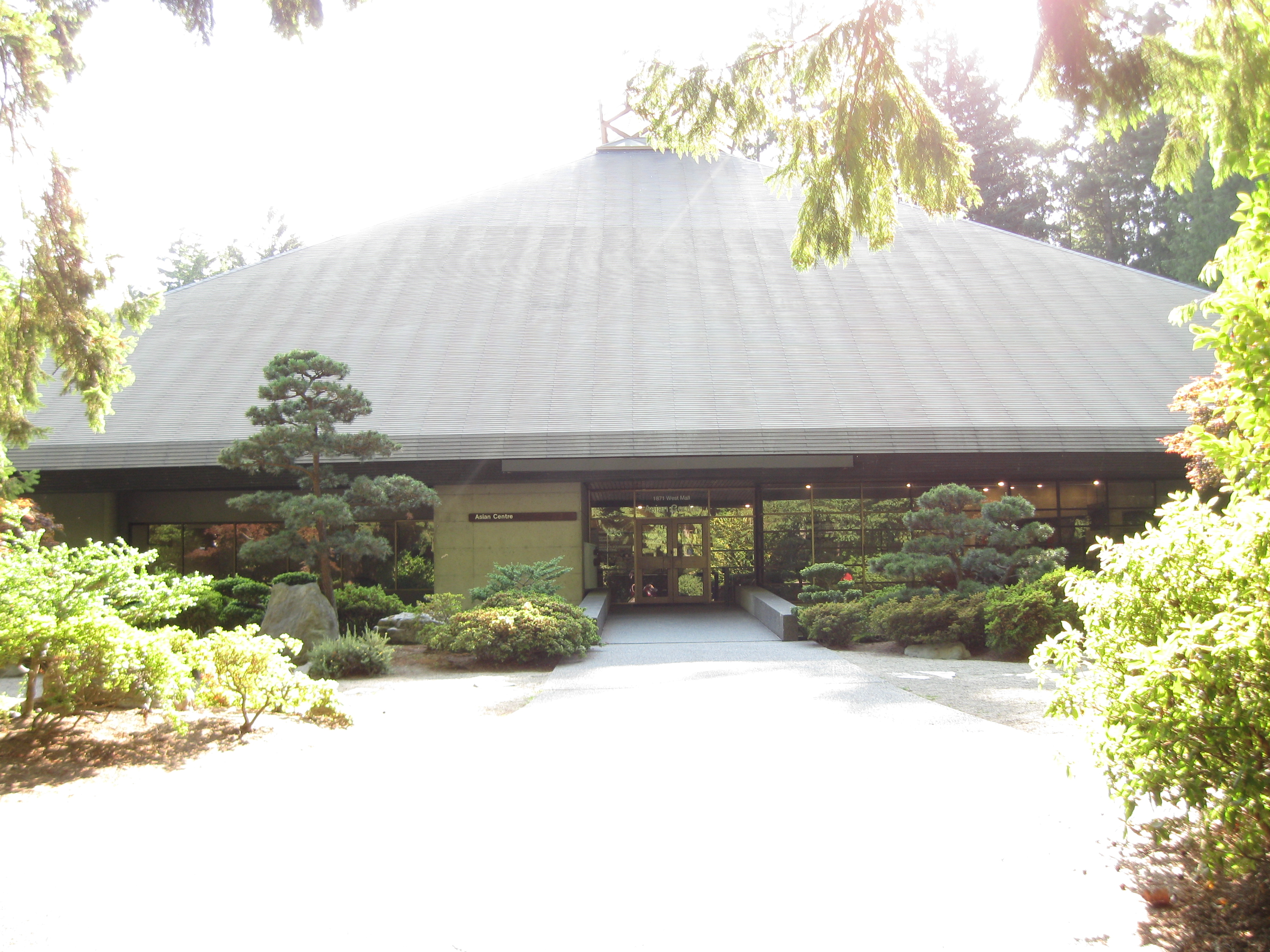
  The UBC Asian Centre, part of the Department of Asian Studies at UBC in Vancouver
  - Department of Anthropology
  - Department of Art History, Visual Art and Theory
  - Department of Asian Studies
  - Department of Classical, Near Eastern and Religious Studies
  - Department of Central Eastern Northern European Studies
  - Vancouver School of Economics
  - Department of English
  - Department of French, Hispanic & Italian Studies
  - Department of Geography
  - Department of History
  - Humanities 101 (Downtown Eastside Community Program and Outreach)
  - School of Journalism
  - School of Library, Archival and Information Studies
  - Department of Linguistics
  - Museum of Anthropology
  - School of Music
  - Department of Philosophy
  - Department of Political Science
  - Department of Psychology
  - School of Social Work
  - Department of Sociology
  - Department of Theatre and Film
  - Women's and Gender Studies Program
- Sauder School of Business
  - Division of Accounting
  - Division of Finance
  - Division of Law
  - Division of Management Information Systems
  - Division of Marketing
  - Master of Business Administration
  - Master of Management in Operations Research
  - Division of Operations and Logistics
  - Division of Organizational Behaviour and Human Resources
  - PhD Program
  - Real Estate Division
  - Division of Strategy and Business Economics
- Continuing Studies
- Faculty of Dentistry
- Faculty of Education
  - Department of Educational and Counseling Psychology, and Special Education
  - Centre for Cross-Faculty Inquiry in Education
  - Department of Curriculum and Pedagogy
  - Department of Educational Studies
  - UBC School of Kinesiology
  - Department of Language and Literacy Education
  - Teacher Education
- Faculty of Forestry
  - Department of Forest Resources Management
  - Department of Forest and Conservation Sciences
  - Department of Wood Science
- Faculty of Graduate Studies
  - Green College
  - St. John's College
  - Interdisciplinary Graduate Studies Program
- College of Health Disciplines
- College for Interdisciplinary Studies
  - Asia Pacific Policy Studies
  - Bioinformatics
  - European Studies
  - Genetics
  - Neuroscience
  - Environmental Health
  - Oncology
  - Planning
  - Resources, Management and Environmental Studies
  - Software Systems
  - Women's and Gender Studies Program
  - Global Resource Systems
  - Applied Biology (formerly Agroecology)
  - Food, Nutrition & Health
  - UBC Farm
  - Dairy Education and Research Centre
  - Graduate Studies
- Peter A. Allard School of Law
- Faculty of Medicine
  - Department of Anesthesiology, Pharmacology and Therapeutics
  - Department of Biochemistry and Molecular Biology
  - Department of Cellular and Physiological Sciences
  - Department of Dermatology and Skin Science
  - Department of Family Practice
  - Department of Medical Genetics
  - Department of Medicine
  - Department of Obstetrics and Gynaecology
  - Department of Occupational Science & Occupational Therapy
  - Department of Ophthalmology and Visual Sciences
  - Department of Orthopaedic Surgery
  - Department of Pathology and Laboratory Medicine
  - Department of Pediatrics
  - Department of Physical Therapy
  - Department of Psychiatry
  - Department of Radiology
  - Department of Surgery
  - Department of Urologic Sciences
  - Division of Continuing Professional Development
  - School of Audiology and Speech Sciences
  - School of Population and Public Health
- Faculty of Pharmaceutical Sciences
- Faculty of Science
  - Department of Botany
  - Department of Chemistry
  - Department of Computer Science
  - Department of Earth and Ocean Sciences
  - Department of Mathematics
  - Department of Microbiology and Immunology
  - Department of Physics and Astronomy
  - Department of Statistics
  - Department of Zoology

== UBC Okanagan ==
- Irving K. Barber Faculty of Arts and Social Sciences (Note: Formerly part of Irving K. Barber School of Arts and Sciences. The school was split into two autonomous faculties in July 2020 as the Faculty of Arts and Humanities and the Faculty of Science.)
  - Department of Community, Culture and Global Studies
  - Department of History and Sociology
  - Department of Economics, Philosophy and Political Science
  - Department of Psychology
- Irving K. Barber Faculty of Science
  - Department of Biology
  - Department of Chemistry
  - Department of Computer Science, Mathematics, Physics and Statistics
  - Department of Earth & Environmental Sciences and Geographic Sciences
- Faculty of Creative and Critical Studies
  - Department of Creative Studies (Art History and Visual Culture, Creative Writing, Devised Theatre, Media Studies, Visual Arts)
  - Department of English and Cultural Studies
  - Department of Languages and World Literatures (French, German, Japanese, Spanish, World Literatures)
- Okanagan School of Education
  - Education Technology Centre
- Faculty of Applied Science (Note: The School of Engineering is a Department under the Faculty of Applied Science, based at UBC Vancouver.)
  - School of Engineering
    - Civil Engineering
    - Electrical Engineering
    - Mechanical Engineering
    - Manufacturing Engineering
- Faculty of Health and Social Development
  - School of Nursing
  - School of Social Work
  - School of Health and Exercise Sciences
    - Health Studies
    - Human Kinetics
- Faculty of Management
- Faculty of Medicine
  - Southern Medical Program
- College of Graduate Studies
