= Bulent Diken =

Danish-Turkish philosopher and sociologist

- Born: 1964 (age 61–62); Turkey

Philosophical work
- Era: Contemporary philosophy
- Region: Western philosophy
- School: Continental
- Main interests: social theory, post-structuralism, nihilism, political philosophy, urban sociology, and immigration

Bulent Diken (born 1964) is a Danish-Turkish philosopher and sociologist who teaches at Lancaster University and Kadir Has University. He has studied urban planning at the Aarhus School of Architecture. He is known for his research on social theory, post-structuralism, nihilism, political philosophy, urban sociology, and immigration. During 1998-1999 he was an assistant professor at Roskilde University, Department of Geography.

== Bibliography ==
- Revolt, Revolution, Critique: The Paradox of Society
- The Sociology of Terrorism
- Nihilism (2009)
- Strangers, Ambivalence and Social Theory (1998)
- Sociology Through the Projector (2007) (with Carsten Bagge Lausten)
- The Culture of Exception: Sociology Facing the Camp (2005) (with Carsten Bagge Lausten)

== See also ==
- Stanley Rosen
