= Olivier Bobineau =

French sociologist

Olivier Bobineau (born 6 March 1972, La Roche-sur-Yon) is a French sociologist specializing in the sociology of religion.

He teaches sociology at the Institut d'Etudes Politiques de Paris, the Institut Catholique de Paris and the École supérieure des sciences économiques et commerciales, he is also Director of the Institut du sens politique. In January 2006, he became scientific collaborator of the officer of the Central Bureau of Religious Affairs, Ministry of Interior.

When he was a teenager, he discovered the Bible and sociology through a priest, and attended lectures in IEP-Bordeaux. For a while he was active in the Socialist Party. Then he became agrégé of economic and social sciences and earned a PhD in sociology of religion at IEP-Paris.

Bobineau criticized the work of the MIVILUDES on cults. His book Le satanisme. Quel Danger pour la société ? raised some controversy since it contradicted the observations made by the MIVILUDES (for which he was scientific advisor in 2005), claiming that Satanists are just a few hundred in France and they pose no danger. He also made public statements about the burqa and Islam.

== Bibliography ==
- Le religieux et le politique, douze réponses de Marcel Gauchet, Desclée de Brower editions, 2010
- La coresponsabilité dans l'Église, utopie ou réalisme, Desclée de Brower editions, 2010
- Les formes élémentaires de l'engagement, une anthropologie du sens, Temps Présent edition, 2010
- Balayer la paroisse ? Une institution catholique qui traverse le temps, Desclée de Brower editions, 2010
- Dieu et César, séparés pour coopérer?, Desclée de Brower editions, 2010
- Former les imams pour la République: L'exemple français, CNRS editions, 2010
- Le satanisme. Quel danger pour la société?, Flammarion-Pygmalion, 2008
- Sociologie des religions, with Sébastien Tank-Storper, Armand Colin, 2007
- Dieu change en paroisse: Une comparaison Franco-Allemande, Presses Universitaires de Rennes, 2005
