= Lisa Taraki =

Palestinian sociologist

- ليزا تراكي لیزا تاراکی
- Born: 1948 (age 77–78); Kingdom of Afghanistan
- Education: Mills College; University at Buffalo
- Occupations: Activist and sociologist
- Spouse: George Giacaman
- Children: 1

Lisa Taraki (Arabic: ليزا تراكي, Persian: لیزا تاراکی; born 1948) is an Afghan-born Palestinian journalist, teacher and sociologist. She is an associate professor of sociology at Birzeit University in the West Bank and a former dean of graduate studies there. She is the co-founder of the university's Institute of Women's Studies and the founding director of its doctoral program in social sciences. Taraki is also the co-founder of the Palestinian Campaign for the Academic and Cultural Boycott of Israel (PACBI), a campaign that spearheaded the BDS movement and advocates for academic and cultural boycotts of Israel until it stops what they see as violations of the Palestinians' human rights. She has also served as the director of the board of trustees for Al Haq.

== Biography ==
Taraki was born in Afghanistan to an American mother and Afghan father. After she had completed secondary school in Kabul, she traveled to the United States where she lived for close to ten years. She studied sociology at Mills College in California and continued her studies at the State University of New York at Buffalo (University at Buffalo) where she earned a Ph.D. in 1982. In her years in the U.S. she came in contact with the student-led anti-war movement against the Vietnam War and with Iranian students opposing the Shah's regime in Iran. During her doctoral studies, she met George Giacaman, a Palestinian student, whom she married. They have one child. In 1976, they decided to move to Ramallah and she took up a position at Birzeit University. The language of instruction was English but as calls for Arabization increased more courses were given in Arabic and she had to learn the language.

In 1980, as student activism grew, Israel issued Military Order 854. Adapted from a Jordanian education law, it placed higher education under military rule. Israel began to control student admissions, curricula and hiring at Palestinian universities. Foreign teaching staff also had to sign a document condemning the Palestine Liberation Organization (PLO) as a terrorist organization in order to get work permits from the Israeli authorities. Taraki and her colleagues signed the document but cut out article 18, the part about the PLO. In the end, the military order was frozen in 1982 due to the university's resistance and international solidarity campaigns. Many of Birzeit's students were arrested by the Israeli military and the university was closed several times. Taraki became an activist and joined legal efforts to free the students from prison. When Birzeit was closed down, she and her colleagues taught in churches, mosques, people's homes, or rented apartments. When the First Intifada began in 1987, Birzeit was closed for four years.

In 1994, Taraki co-founded the Women's Studies program at Birzeit, the first of its kind in West Asia. In 2015, she helped launch the doctoral program in social studies at Birzeit, the first of its kind at a Palestinian university.

In 2002, Taraki became involved in the campaign to boycott Israel. This led her to co-found PACBI in 2004, from which the Palestinian-led BDS movement emerged the following year. The movement calls for broad boycotts and divestment initiatives against Israel, similar to those applied to South Africa in the apartheid era, until Israel meets what the movement terms Israel's obligations under international law. She also serves on the advisory board of the US Campaign for the Academic and Cultural Boycott of Israel (USACBI).

== Academic career ==
Taraki's research has focused on urban social history, the Palestinian national movement, gender in the Middle East, and on informal justice systems.

Taraki is the editor of Living Palestine: Family Survival, Resistance, and Mobility under Occupation published in 2006, a collection of research essays about the everyday lives of Palestinians living under occupation. The book is based on data from a survey of 2,000 Palestinian households in 19 communities in the West Bank and Gaza conducted in the summer of 1999. The book was favorably reviewed by Annelies Moors who wrote that "[t]hese contributions point to the insights one can gain from household surveys when gender-sensitive questions on labour, education, marriage, and so on are included." Maya Rosenfeld found the book a "timely addition to the disturbingly slender body of academic research on Palestinian society" during the current phase of Israeli military occupation.

== Publications ==
=== Books ===
- Palestinian Society: Contemporary Realities and Trends. Women's Studies Program, Birzeit University. 1997.
- Living Palestine: Family Survival, Resistance, and Mobility under Occupation. Syracuse University Press. 2006. ISBN 978-0-8156-3107-1.

=== Chapters ===
- Naseer Aruri, ed. (1989). "Mass Organizations in the West Bank". Occupation: Israel Over Palestine. Belmont, MA: AAUG Press. pp. 431–463.
- Jamal Raji Nassar; Roger Heacock, eds. (1990). "The development of political consciousness among Palestinians in the Occupied Territories". Intifada: Palestine at the Crossroads. Praeger. ISBN 978-0-275-93411-8.

=== Articles ===
- Taraki, Lisa (2008). "Enclave Micropolis: The Paradoxical Case of Ramallah/al-Bireh". Journal of Palestine Studies. 37 (4): 6–20. doi:10.1525/jps.2008.37.4.6. ISSN 0377-919X.
- Taraki, Lisa (2000). "Higher Education, Resistance, and State Building in Palestine". International Higher Education (18). doi:10.6017/ihe.2000.18.6857. ISSN 2372-4501.
- Taraki, Lisa (2006). "Review: Even-Handedness and the Palestinian-Israeli/Israeli-Palestinian "Conflict"". Contemporary Sociology. 35 (5): 449–453. doi:10.1177/009430610603500503. ISSN 0094-3061. S2CID 143822370.
- Taraki, Lisa (1989). "The Islamic Resistance Movement in the Palestinian Uprising". Middle East Report (156): 30–32. doi:10.2307/3012813. ISSN 0899-2851. JSTOR 3012813.
- Taraki, Lisa (1995). "Islam Is the Solution: Jordanian Islamists and the Dilemma of the 'Modern Woman'". The British Journal of Sociology. 46 (4): 643–661. doi:10.2307/591576. ISSN 0007-1315. JSTOR 591576. PMID 7493154. S2CID 36550459.
- "In the Service of Oppression and Militarism: the Complicity of Israeli Universities in the Structures of Domination and State Violence" (PDF). World Congress for Middle Eastern Studies. July 19–24, 2010.
