= National Development and Research Institutes =

American-based think tank

- Established: 1967
- President: Steven Holt
- Budget: Revenue: $10,376,520; Expenses: $10,291,762 (FYE March 2015)
- Address: 71 West 23rd Street, 4th Floor; New York, NY 10010
- Location: New York, New York
- Website: www.ndri.org
- Dissolved: June 30, 2019

National Development and Research Institutes, Inc. (NDRI) was an independent New York City based 501(c)(3) non-profit think tank founded in 1967 (then, called Narcotic and Drug Research Institutes, Inc.) that ceased operations June 30, 2019.

NDRI specialized in Federally-funded research in the areas of drug and alcohol abuse, treatment and recovery; HIV, AIDS and Hepatitis C; therapeutic communities; youth at risk; and related areas of public health, mental health, criminal justice, urban problems, prevention and epidemiology.

NDRI received the 2009 BBVA Foundation Frontiers of Knowledge Award in the category of Development Cooperation for its contribution to the analysis of foreign aid provision, and its challenge to the conventional wisdom in development assistance.
