= Ana Díaz (Mexican singer) =

Mexican musical artist (born 1972)

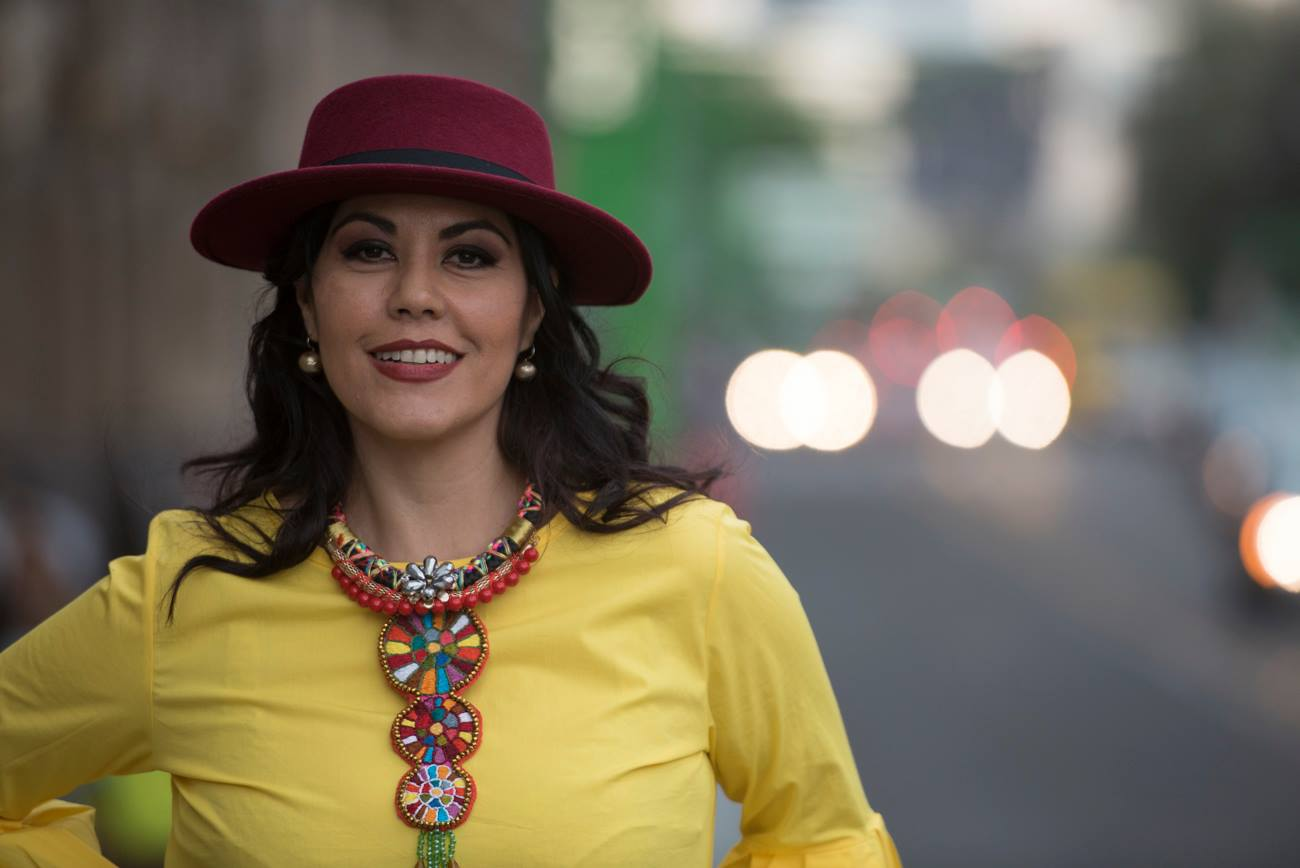

Background information
- Also known as: Ana Díaz
- Born: Ana Margarita Díaz Aceves; 6 February 1972 (age 54); Oaxaca de Juarez, Mexico
- Genres: World music, jazz, Mexican contemporary
- Occupations: Singer, songwriter, entrepreneur
- Instrument: Voice
- Years active: 1993–present
- Label: Independent
- Website: Ana Diaz.com

Ana Margarita Díaz Aceves (born February 6, 1972), better known as Ana Diaz, is a Mexican composer and singer of contemporary Mexican songs. In her musical style, she mixes sounds like jazz, blues, bossa nova, ballad, pop, Latin music, cumbia and Mexican rhythms, which essentially makes her genre world music.

== Biography ==
Ana Díaz was born in Oaxaca. Her mother is from Guadalajara and her father from Sola de Vega. Her love for music and words comes from them. In her most recent work, Ana has approached the Chilean solteca, a genre native to the region, which she inherited from her father's family, particularly her grandmother. Interested from an early age, she began singing as an adolescent. Years later, she attended the Universidad Intercontinental in Mexico City, where she got a degree in communications. Even though she did not study music formally, Ana dedicated herself to taking private singing lessons. Her first teacher was Nayeli Nesme, Mexican singer-songwriter, whose classes she paid for by singing in religious ceremonies on the weekends. She later moved back to Oaxaca and continued her self-taught musical studies. It was there that she associated with other musicians to form different groups, the most significant ones being the duet formed with Oaxacan singer-songwriter Lorenzo Lopez and that formed with Mexican jazz musician Julio Garcia: Reloj de Arena. With Garcia, she began experimenting with musical genres new to her, such as jazz, funk and blues, also taking her to choral music, traditional music and children's music. In 2004, she took up her work as a soloist again and together with Cuban pianist Nilda Brizuela, she recorded one of her most significant works: Clouds of June. It has been fundamental to Ana to not focus her work on one single genre. She has opted for fusing diverse musical forms that she has come in contact with and using them in each of her CD's and compositions. She is a singer, composer, elementary school teacher and businesswoman.

== Musical concept ==
Aside from being a performer, Diaz writes part of the repertory she sings. She selects the rest of the material ranging from folkloric pieces from her native Oaxaca and Mexico to standards of jazz, bossa nova, trova, choral music, children's music, blues, Brazilian rhythms, African rhythms and Latin American folklore. She began by singing trova in 1993. Her concept is based on the fusion of diverse sounds and rhythms with palpable influences from Latin music, soft jazz, blues, pop and rock.

== History ==
Ana was a fellow of the FOESCA grant in 2003 and the PECDA grant in 2010. From the beginning, she has been self-taught. She writes some of the songs she performs with arrangements by musicians like Cuban pianist Nilda Brizuela, jazz musician Julio Garcia and the jazz pianist and guitarist Oscar Rafael Martínez from Oaxaca. Throughout her career, Ana has worked with such artists as Ernesto Anaya, Mexicanto, Tania Libertad, Lila Downs, Fernando Delgadillo, David Haro, Jose Hinojosa, Gerardo Peña, Carlos Porcel Nahuel, Victor Martinez, Geo Meneses, Hector Infanzon, Lorena y Los Alebrijes and Jaramar, among others, on various stages of Oaxaca and the rest of Mexico. Ana Diaz's music has been transmitted by different media such as television and the Oaxacan state radio. In 2004, she presented her album Life Begins via the Internet on the radio program La Hora México, transmitted by Radio Círculo de Madrid in Spain which was presented by Alejandro Aura. In March 2007, an interview with her was aired nationally as part of the program Voices Inside for Radio Educación. She was interviewed for The National Hour, which airs throughout Mexico, in March 2007, introducing the production of Clouds of June.

She devotes herself to promoting her work as a singer-songwriter and performer of contemporary popular music or fusion music giving concerts in various places inside and outside of Oaxaca.

She promotes and supports several cultural projects such as the children's compositions by Rene Cortes, with whom she created Guess What, Tangerine, in 1998, a proposal of children's songs, which in 2004 allowed them to produce The Little House of the Sun, a collection of three books and a CD premiered with the Symphony Orchestra of Oaxaca. In 2008, she participated in the album It's Time to Learn about Children's Rights, produced by the State DIF in Oaxaca.

In recent years, Diaz has collaborated with the Mexican singer Lila Downs to benefit the Guadalupe Musalem Scholarship Fund in Oaxaca City for poor, indigenous women to continue their studies.[3] At the moment, Diaz is working as a composer, since she recently received the Maria Greever grant, given by well-recognized Mexican institutions such as Auditorio Nacional, the Alfredo Harp Helu Foundation and CONACULTA, among others. This same year she received the award for Best Interpretation at the Mexico, Song of my Heart nationwide contest with her song "Arrecifes de Coral".

== Concert highlights ==
Among her most important shows are:

- 2006. Festival of Oaxacan Culture, Oaxaca, Oaxaca
- 2006. Third Coyoacan Festival, Mexico City
- 2007. Festival of Oaxacan Culture, Oaxaca, Oaxaca
- 2007. October Festival in Guadalajara, Jalisco
- 2007. Ocean Festival, Salina Cruz, Oaxaca
- 2008. Forum for Oaxacan Creators, Oaxaca, Oaxaca
- 2008. Autumn in Lagos, Lagos de Moreno, Jalisco
- 2009. San Marcos Fair, Aguascalientes, Aguascalientes
- 2009. Papirolas Festival, Guadalajara, Jalisco
- 2009. Dominical Route Festival, Teposcolula, Oaxaca
- 2009. Iztapalapa Christmas Festival, Mexico City
- 2010. Ortiz Tirado Festival, FAOT, Sonora
- 2010. Macedonio Alcala Theater Centennial, Oaxaca, Oaxaca
- 2010. Humanitas Festival, Oaxaca, Oaxaca
- 2011. May Festivals in Oaxaca 2011, Oaxaca, Oaxaca
- 2011. Rodolfo Morales Cultural Week, Oaxaca, Oaxaca
- 2011. Opening of the Pan-American Races, Huatulco, Oaxaca
- 2011. Opening for Armando Manzanero concert, Oaxaca, Oaxaca
- 2011. Singing roll in CATRINA, directed by Oaxacan dancer/choreographer Noel Suástegui, with eighty artists on stage

== Social causes ==
- 2002. Listen to the S.O.S., Concert for COESIDA, Oaxaca, Oaxaca
- 2004. First concert in benefit of Estancia Fraternidad, Oaxaca, Oaxaca
- 2005. Second concert in benefit of Estancia Fraternidad, Oaxaca, Oaxaca
- 2007. Concert in benefit of the Rosario Castellanos Women's Space, Oaxaca, Oaxaca
- 2007. Concert participation in benefit of the Guadalupe Musalem Scholarship Fund along with Lila Downs
- 2009. Musical evening participation in benefit of the Guadalupe Musalem Scholarship Fund along with Lila Downs
- 2011. Musical evening participation in benefit of the Guadalupe Musalem Scholarship Fund along with Lila Downs

== Live collaborations ==
- 2003. Participation in Amina Lawal, a dance performed by the Contemporary Ballet of the City of Oaxaca, by choreographer Laura Vera
- 2011. Participation in the Contemporary Ballet of the City of Oaxaca, by choreographer Laura Vera
- 2011. San Luis International Fair, with the children's musical group Bandula, San Luis Potosí, Mexico
- Singing roll in CATRINA, directed by Oaxacan dancer/choreographer Noel Suástegui, with eighty artists on stage

== Media presence ==
- La Hora Nacional (national radio)
- Animal Nocturno on TV Azteca (national television)
- Radio Educación (national radio)
- IMER (national radio)
- CORTV Oaxaca (local television)
- La Hora México, Spain
- Interview for Spain on musicnightinternational.com
- Various radio programs on the Internet
- Special program for Radio IRA 13, Bahía Blanca, Argentina
- El Imparcial (local press)
- Noticias (local press)
- Mujeres (local magazine)

== Discography ==
=== Studio albums ===
- 2002: Recuerdos (Memories), independently produced
- 2003: La vida que comienza (Life Begins), independently produced
- 2004: Nubes de junio (Clouds of June), independently produced
- 2008: Esta noche (Tonight), independently produced

=== Compilation albums ===
- 2007: Lo mejor de Ana Díaz (The Best of Ana Diaz), independently produced
- 2009: Armonía en el Zócalo (Harmony in City Square), produced by the Secretary of Culture and the Arts, Oaxaca State Government

=== Collaborations ===
- 2000: La Luna (The Moon), CD by Italian singer-songwriter Daniel Semprini, independently produced
- 2003: La Casita del Sol (The Little House of the Sun), songs by Rene Cortes, produced by Editorial Porrua
- 2007: Es tiempo de aprender los derechos de los niños (It's Time to Learn about Children's Rights), produced by the DIF Oaxaca
- 2010: Canta, Oaxaca, y llora (Sing, Oaxaca, and Cry), produced by the Rotary Club of Oaxaca
- 2011: Chulita de mi alma (Precious Soul-Child), independently produced
- 2013: "La La La" ("FEEL" album) by Japanese pop-singer Namie Amuro (lyrics & music)
