= Sigrid Quack =

German social scientist (born 1958)

- Education: Freie Universitaet Berlin
- Scientific career
- Fields: Sociology of organisations, Sociology of regulation and law, Comparative and transnational sociology
- Workplaces: University of Duisburg-Essen, Brown University, Max Planck Institute for the Study of Societies,

Sigrid Quack (born 17 July 1958) is a German social scientist working in the field of comparative sociology. She is a professor of sociology at the University of Duisburg-Essen in Germany, where she is the Director of the Centre for Global Cooperation Research. Quack was a senior fellow at the Watson Institute for International Studies, Brown University.

== Biography ==
Quack studied sociology in Paris and Berlin. Her doctorate was awarded by the Free University of Berlin in 1992 on the topic of dynamics of part-time work, and she subsequently worked at the Wissenschaftszentrum Berlin für Sozialforschung. In 2007, she received her habilitation for scholarship on cross-border institutional development, and became a professor at the University of Cologne based at the Max Planck Institute for the Study of Societies from 2007 until 2013.

== Research ==
Leonhard Dobusch, Philip Mader and Sigrid Quack

Quack is the head of an international research group on transnational institution-building. Her work has examined the phenomenon of transnationality and governance, with a focus on how global governance institutions increasingly interact with politics and practices on the ground. In particular, she has studied governance across borders in the fields of copyright and open access, financial reporting, the regulation of multinational companies, environmentalism, and labor rights. She is the author or editor of numerous books and articles on globalization, institutions and regulation.

In 2020 and 2021, Quack was President of the Society for the Advancement of Socio-Economics, a key international scholarly society in the field of economic sociology.
