= Joseph Lopreato =

American sociologist and sociobiologist

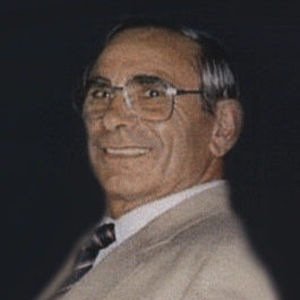
Joseph Lopreato

Joseph Lopreato (July 13, 1928 in Stefanaconi, Italy – March 25, 2015 in Georgetown, Texas, United States) was a sociobiologist, a social theorist, and a professor of sociology. After receiving his Ph.D. from Yale University (1960) he taught and lectured at various universities in the US and abroad, and published a dozen books and monographs plus numerous papers in several languages. He died in Georgetown, Texas, on March 25, 2015, and is buried in Austin, Texas.

== Career ==
His work spanned various fields of theory and research, including migration and underdevelopment, social inequality and change, political sociology, the sociological classics, the philosophy of science, and evolutionary demography, among others. Joseph Lopreato was one of the first sociologists to take up the challenge from behavioral evolutionary biology ("sociobiology") to work toward a synthesis of the biological and sociocultural disciplines. He is accordingly best known for his work as a human sociobiologist.

His work in sociobiology, preeminently Human Nature and Biocultural Evolution (1984) and Crisis in Sociology: The Need for Darwin (with his former student, Timothy Crippen, 1999), provides a theory of human nature embedded in a taxonomy of "behavioral predispositions"; a demonstration of bio-cultural interdependence in such areas as ethnicity, sex roles, and social inequality; an argument that the "crisis" in sociology arises primarily from the failure to discover even a single general law or principle ("no general law, no science"); and, inter alia, a well-reasoned appeal for a scientific sociology through the exploitation of the sociobiology "fitness principle," to which he has attached a number of important culture-relevant conditions.

In Peasants No More (1967), he studied the effects of emigration in Southern Italy.

== Selected bibliography ==
- Lopreato, J. (1967). Peasants No More: Social Class and Social Change in an Underdeveloped Society. Chandler Publishing.
- Lopreato, J. & L. Hazelrigg (1972). Class, Conflict, and Mobility: Theories and Studies of Class Structure. Chandler Publishing. ISBN 0-8102-0429-0.
- Lopreato, J. (1984). Human Nature and Biocultural Evolution. Allen & Unwin. ISBN 0-04-573017-2.
- Lopreato, J. & T. Crippen (1999). Crisis in Sociology: The Need for Darwin. Transaction Publishers. ISBN 0-7658-0874-9.
