= James Hawdon =

American sociologist, academic, and author

- Born: United States
- Occupations: Sociologist, academic and author

Academic background
- Education: B.A., Sociology; M.A., Sociology; PhD, Sociology
- Alma mater: Pennsylvania State University; University of Virginia

James E. Hawdon is an American sociologist, academic, and author. He is a professor of sociology and a director for the Center for Peace Studies and Violence Prevention at Virginia Tech.

Hawdon is most known for his work on sociology, deviance cycles and cyber intolerance. Among his authored works are publications in academic journals, as well as books such as The Causes and Consequences of Group Violence: From Bullies to Terrorists and Marijuana in America: Culture, Political, and Medical Controversies.

Hawdon is the recipient of the Wayman Mullins Award from the Society for Police and Criminal Psychology. He is an associate editor of the American Journal of Criminal Justice.

== Education ==
Hawdon completed a BA in sociology at Pennsylvania State University. He completed a MA and PhD in sociology at the University of Virginia.

== Career ==
Hawdon began his academic career in 1987 as a lecturer at the University of Virginia and served until 1992. Subsequently, he joined Clemson University, where he held an appointment as an assistant professor of sociology between 1992 and 1997 and as an associate professor of sociology between 1998 and 2004. In 2004, he joined Virginia Tech, where he held multiple appointments, including serving as an associate professor of sociology from 2004 to 2008. Since 2008, he has been serving as a professor of sociology at Virginia Tech.

Since 2011, he has been serving as the director of the Center for Peace Studies and Violence Prevention at Virginia Tech.

== Research ==
Hawdon's sociology research has won him The 2025 Southern Criminal Justice Association's Outstanding Educator Award, the 2024 Virginia Association of Criminal Justice Educators' Safe Society Leadership Award, The 2023 Fulbright-University of Turku Scholar Award, the 2019 Society for Police and Criminal Psychology’s Wayman Mullins Award for Best Journal Article, the Adele Mellen Prize for Contributions to Scholarship, and several other awards. He has authored numerous publications spanning the areas of drugs, policing, criminology and online hate speech including books and articles in peer-reviewed journals. In 2022, he was awarded an honorary doctorate from the University of Turku, Finland, in recognition of his on-going research contributions.

=== Criminology ===
Hawdon's criminology research has contributed to the identification of the social factors that contribute to crime as well as social responses to crime. His early research used data from several neighborhoods in South Carolina to analyze how community organizations and police-community relations affect crime rates, finding that community organizations can help reduce crime by increasing social capital and improving citizen perceptions of policy legitimacy. In later research, he investigated how communities responded to mass tragedies. In studies of communities that suffered mass tragedies, including school shootings at Virginia Tech and in Jokela and Kauhajoki Finland, he and his colleagues found that incidents such as school shootings can evoke strong emotions and unify communities to restore their compromised sense of security through shared moral emotions. Furthermore, his study established that the surge in solidarity is sustained by participating in community-focused events, and this heightened solidarity helps both community recovery and the wellbeing of community members even a year after the tragedy. In related research, he explored the link between fear of different types of crimes and community solidarity, illustrating that fear of routine street crimes decreases solidarity, whereas concern over collective-targeted crimes like school shootings enhances community solidarity. In a collaborative study with Matthew Costello, he conducted a criminological analysis to identify factors linked to participation in online attacks and offered recommendations to aid in the identification, mitigation, and prevention of online hate creation and dissemination. Focusing his research efforts on cyberviolence, his study emphasized the significance of socio-demographic traits and online routines in sustaining cyberviolence while advocating for an integrative approach that draws from multiple criminological theories to comprehend the intricate factors influencing participation in cyberhate attacks among American adolescents. In research with colleagues Thomas Dearden and Katalin Parti, he investigated the factors that lead to engaging in cybercrimes, finding strong support for Institutional Anomie Theory. They also conducted research on cybercrime victimization among businesses, suggesting that larger companies, those that do not have separate Wi-Fi networks for visitors and employees, and those lacking stringent data storage policies are significantly more likely to experience cybercrime victimization compared to other companies.

=== Cyber intolerance ===
Hawdon's cyber intolerance research has provided insights into the role of social media platforms and other factors facilitating online hate speech and extremism. His research on hate material exposure among Finnish youth emphasized the significance of fostering positive online behavior and minimizing negative online conduct to preserve social trust. In his cross-national examination of youth and young adults' exposure to hate materials online, his study established significant variations across countries and presented evidence supporting the potential effectiveness of anti-hate speech laws in reducing such exposure. Furthermore, he investigated the disparities in exposure to online hate material targeting sexuality and found that individuals residing in the southern United States and rural areas are more susceptible to such targeting based on sexual orientation. In 2021, his study advanced the understanding of cyberhate by introducing Ronald Aker's Social Structure-Social Learning Theory (SSSL), shedding light on the social factors influencing its production. The research also emphasized the importance of acknowledging political rhetoric's role in the generation of online hate, urging policymakers to consider this aspect when addressing the issue.

=== Drug use and deviance cycles ===
Hawdon's drug research offers a comprehensive analysis of deviance cycles and their correlation with social and economic shifts in American society. His early research contributed to understanding how policy rhetoric influences the creation, sustenance, and termination of moral panics related to drug policies, ultimately concluding that President Reagan skillfully incited a public moral panic concerning drug policies. In related research, his book Drugs and Alcohol Consumption as a Function of Social Structure: A Cross-cultural Sociology provides insights into how rationalization and modernization influence drug and alcohol consumption patterns across diverse cultures and social structures, offering information for designing policies and interventions to reduce drug use and related harms. His book Encyclopedia of Drug Policy explored the dimensions of the War on Drugs, employing academic perspectives to examine subjects encompassing Mexican kingpins, Colombian cartels, narco-terrorism, heroin production, and governmental spending. His 2022 book, Marijuana in America: Culture, Political, and Medical Controversies, offers an exploration of medical, legal, historical, and cultural issues surrounding cannabis in the United States and the modern world. In a collaborative study with Robert Todd Perdue, his study emphasized the inadequacy of current data on novel psychoactive drug (NPD) abuse and proposed the use of big data for predictive analysis to address emerging NPD challenges through improved data collection and analysis.

== Awards and honors ==
- 1988 – Bierstedt Award in Sociology, University of Virginia
- 2005 – Adele Mellen Prize for Contributions to Scholarship
- 2013 – Excellence in Research Award, College of Liberal Arts and Human Sciences
- 2018 – Wayman Mullins Award, Society for Police and Criminal Psychology
- 2020 – Inductee to the Academy of Faculty Service, Virginia Tech
- 2022 – Doctorate Honoris Causa, University of Turku
- 2023 – Alumni Award for Excellence in International Research, Virginia Tech
- 2023 – Excellence in Outreach and International Initiatives Award, College of Liberal Arts and Human Sciences
- 2023 – Fulbright-University of Turku Scholar Award, Fulbright Finland Foundation
- 2024 – Virginia Association of Criminal Justice Educators Safe Society Leadership Award
- 2025 - Southern Criminal Justice Association Outstanding Educator Award

== Bibliography ==
=== Selected books ===
- The Causes and Consequences of Group Violence: From Bullies to Terrorists (2016) ISBN 9781498500432
- Reconciliation after Civil Wars: Global Perspectives (2018) ISBN 9780815351122
- Marijuana in America: Culture, Political, and Medical Controversies (2022) ISBN 9781440869631
- Research Handbook on Hate and Hate Crime in Society (2024) ISBN 9781803925721
- Perceptions of a Pandemic: A Cross-Continental Comparison of Citizen Perceptions, Attitudes, and Behaviors During Covid-19 (2025) ISBN 9781836086253
- Online Hate and Extremism: Patterns of Production, Exposure, and Interventions in a Cross-National Context (2026) ISBN 9781837083541

=== Selected articles ===
- Hawdon, J. E. (2001). The role of presidential rhetoric in the creation of a moral panic: Reagan, Bush, and the war on drugs. Deviant behavior, 22(5), 419–445.
- Hawdon, J. E., Ryan, J., & Griffin, S. P. (2003). Policing tactics and perceptions of police legitimacy. Police quarterly, 6(4), 469–491.
- Hawdon, J. (2008). Legitimacy, trust, social capital, and policing styles: A theoretical statement. Police quarterly, 11(2), 182–201.
- Oksanen, A., Hawdon, J., Holkeri, E., Näsi, M., & Räsänen, P. (2014). Exposure to online hate among young social media users. In Soul of society: A focus on the lives of children & youth (pp. 253–273). Emerald Group Publishing Limited.
- Hawdon, J., Oksanen, A., & Räsänen, P. (2017). Exposure to online hate in four nations: A cross-national consideration. Deviant behavior, 38(3), 254–266.
