= Ole Thyssen =

Ole Thyssen (born November 3, 1944) is a Danish philosopher and sociologist, and Professor at the Copenhagen Business School.

== Biography ==
Thyssen is a MA from the University of Copenhagen from 1971, and he became a Doctor of Philosophy from that same university in 1976.

He started out as a marxist philosopher, writing about psychoanalysis, Karl Marx and Wilhelm Reich. Beginning in the mid-1980s, however, his focus has gradually shifted towards the sociological systems theory of Niklas Luhmann, and much less political themes.

In the mid-1990s he was appointed Professor at the Copenhagen Business School, where he was also one of the initiators of the combination MA degree in Business Administration and Philosophy in 1995.

Recent works by Thyssen have focused on management philosophy and values-based management (not to be confused with value-based management), as well as on a number of sociological themes. Most are based on Luhmann's systems theory.

== Publications ==
Books:

- Thyssen, Ole. Værdiledelse. Gyldendal A/S, 2007.

Articles, a selection:

- Peter Pruzan and Ole Thyssen. "Conflict and consensus: Ethics as a shared value horizon for strategic planning." Human Systems Management 9.3 (1990): 135–151.
- Thyssen, Ole. "Luhmann and epistemology." Cybernetics & Human Knowing 11.1 (2004): 7-22.
- Christensen, Lars Thøger, Mette Morsing and Ole Thyssen. "The polyphony of corporate social responsibility: deconstructing transparency and accountability and opening for identity and hypocrisy." Organization (2011): 457–474.
