= François de Singly =

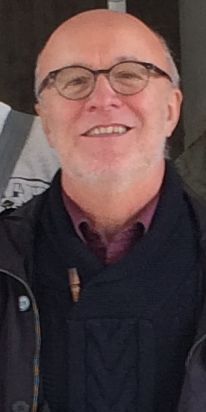
François de Singly in 2014

François de Singly (born 1948) was born in Dreux, is a French sociologist and professor of sociology at Paris Descartes University.

He has worked a lot about family.
