= Ana María Díaz Stevens =

Puerto Rican-American sociologist

- Occupation: Professor Emeritus
- Employer: Union Theological Seminary
- Known for: Sociology of religion

Ana María Díaz Stevens is a Puerto Rican-American sociologist with a focus on Latinos and Latinas in religion, especially Roman Catholicism. She was inaugurated as a full faculty member at Union Theological Seminary in 1999, making her the first Latin American to hold that position at the university. She later became the Chairperson of the Church and Society at the seminary.

External videos
- Fuego a la Lata: The Puerto Rican Experience in New York

Stevens focuses on the role of women in Roman Catholicism. She finds their contributions to be very important in that they establish what she calls a "matriarchal core". She especially focuses on the impacts of Puerto Ricans in New York City: "We Puerto Ricans contributed tremendously in terms of this city’s spiritual well-being and the identity of the Hispanic community. And sometimes that is not recognized.”

Before becoming a professor, Stevens was a nun in the Catholic church. She has also taught at Queens College of the City University of New York as an adjunct assistant professor of modern languages, sociology, and Puerto Rican studies; Fordham University as an assistant professor of social science; and Rutgers University as an assistant professor of Puerto Rican and Hispanic studies. Before teaching, she worked with New York Catholic Archdiocese, Brooklyn Catholic Diocese, and Centro de Evangelizacion.

== Written works ==
- Oxcart Catholicism on Fifth Avenue: The Impact of the Puerto Rican Migration upon the Archdiocese of New York, 1993
- The Religious Experience of Latinos in the United States: An Interdisciplinary Perspective, 1994
- An Enduring Flame: Popular Religiosity of Latinos, 1994
- Recognizing the Latino Resurgence in U.S. Religion, 1997.
- “Fuego a la Lata: The Puerto Rican Experience in New York — Mobilizing Institutions and Institutions Mobilizing”. May 5, 2011.
