= Robert J. Holton =

Professor of Sociology

Robert J Holton (born 9 September 1946) is Emeritus Professor of Sociology at Trinity College, Dublin. He is a specialist in social theory, historical sociology and the study of globalization, and the sociology of artificial intelligence.

Holton received his BA from the University of Sussex, his MA from (Trinity College, Dublin), and his DPhil from the University of Sussex in 1973 with a thesis "Syndicalism and its impact in Britain with particular reference to Merseyside 1910–14".

During the 1980s his focus was on the 'transition to capitalism' debate, publishing The Transition from Feudalism to Capitalism (1985), (parts of which have been published in Polish) and Cities, Capitalism and Civilization (1986), (later published in Turkish) This body of work drew increasingly on the Weberian critique of Marxist approaches to long-run social change. The aim was to provide a non-teleological and multi-dimensional account of why modern capitalism emerged in the West.

He also developed an intellectual partnership with Bryan S. Turner, in the latter part of the 1980s while they were both working at Flinders University in areas of social theory pertaining to Talcott Parsons and Max Weber. This resulted in two books, Talcott Parsons on Economy and Society (1986) and Max Weber on Economy on Economy and Society (1989).

In 1992, Holton published Economy and Society (later translated into Portuguese). This offered a way of linking economic, political and cultural processes in economic life, thereby avoiding problems of economic determinism and reductionism associated with orthodox economic theory and much of the Marxist tradition.

Meanwhile, at a policy level, he was Director of the Centre for Multicultural Studies at Flinders University between 1987 and the late 1990s. Important themes developed by the Centre include the economics of multiculturalism incorporating ethnic business, and cross-cultural issues in the education of professionals.

As a result of this body of work Holton was elected to a Fellowship of the Academy of Social Sciences in Australia in 1995.

From the mid-1990s to the present day Holton has published extensively on economic, political and cultural aspects of globalization. His study Globalization and the Nation State, first published in 1998 and translated into Chinese, was later revised in a second edition, published in 2011. Other major work includes Making Globalization (2005), Global Networks (2008), and Cosmopolitanisms (2009). Much of the research for this body of work was conducted while Professor of Sociology at Trinity College Dublin from 2001 to 2008.

His two latest books are Global Finance published by Routledge in March 2012, and Global Inequalities published by Palgrave Macmillan in December 2014. This recent body of work looks at problems of social instability associated with the legitimation crisis facing global finance, and complex patterns of global inequality both within and between countries.

Most recently Robert Holton has begun a research project on the social impact of robotics and artificial intelligence.
