= Ayelet Giladi =

Israeli educational sociologist (born 1964)

- איילת גלעדי
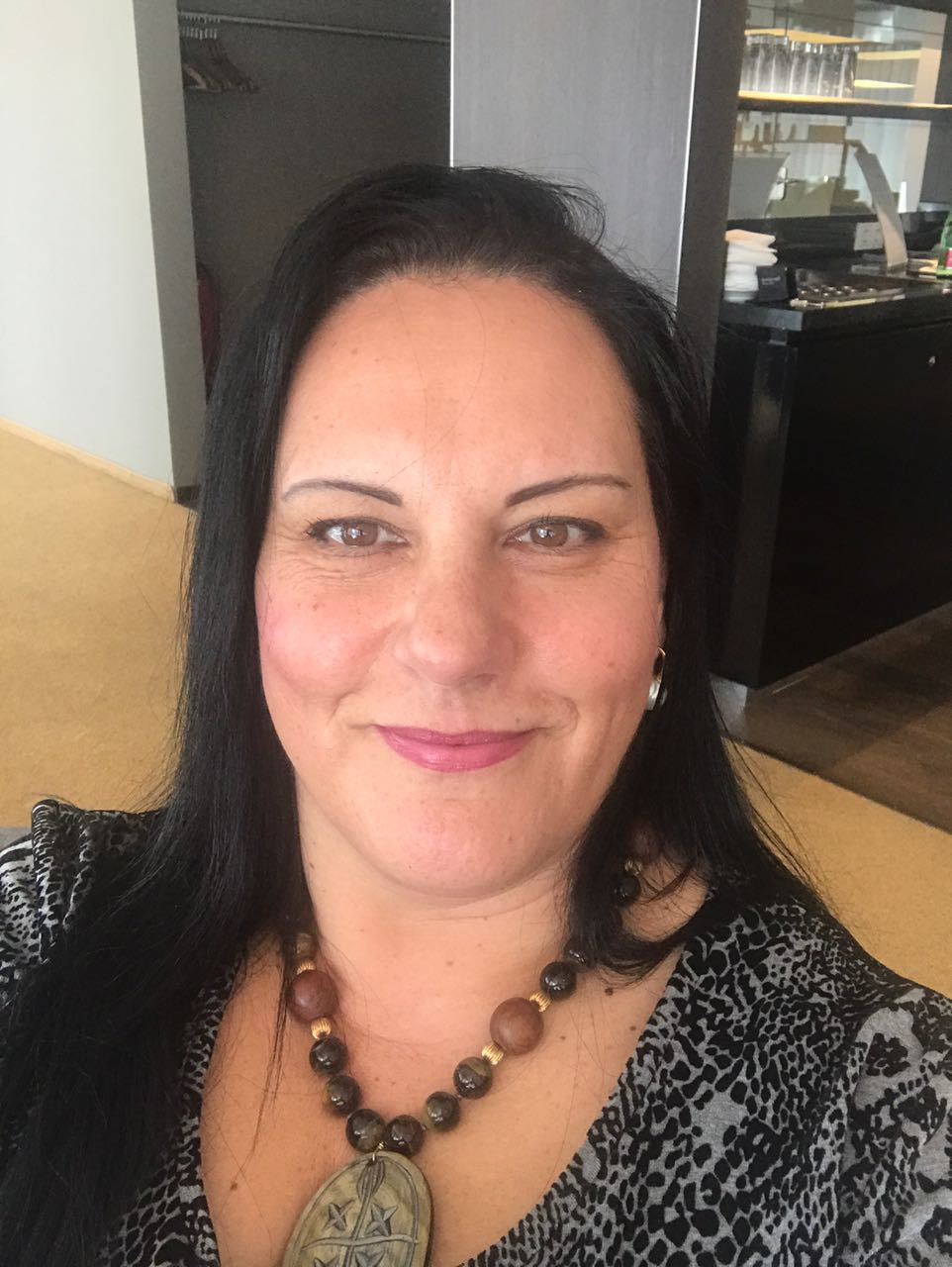
- Born: 21 December 1964 (age 61); Jerusalem
- Occupation: Educational sociologist

Ayelet Giladi (Hebrew: איילת גלעדי; born 21 December 1964) is an Israeli educational sociologist and Chairwoman of The Jerusalem Ballet. Her field of expertise is Early Childhood (ECED). Giladi is a pioneer and a recognized expert on the abuse of young children in Israel.
She is the founder and the director of the Voice of the Child (VOC) Association for the Prevention of Sexual Abuse among Young Children.
Dr. Giladi is a counselor and a pioneer for the prevention of sexual harassment among young children. She teaches worldwide courses that focus on equipping young children with tools to prevent sexual harassment.

== Education ==
Giladi earned her undergraduate and master's degrees at the Hebrew University of Jerusalem. She earned a Doctorate in sociology education from Anglia Polytechnic University, England.

== Career ==
In 2012, she became the General and Academic Director of the Early Childhood Programs, From 'Birth till the university' (FBTU ) at the NCJW Research Institute for Innovation in Education at the Hebrew University of Jerusalem.

She is also the author of Sexual Harassment – No Children's Play, a book that focuses on identifying early childhood sexual harassment, understanding and coping with it, and the prevention of the phenomenon in the educational system and community. This book sheds light on the intricacies surrounding children's sexual harassment, its prevention, and the societal approach towards the matter.
Giladi has been invited to speak on her field of expertise in various educational institutions and corporate venues across the globe. She speaks about identifying, preventing and raising awareness about children's sexual harassment in a series of lectures, seminars and workshops, under the hashtag #metoochildren.

In recent years, Giladi has expanded her work into arts management and cultural diplomacy. She currently serves as the Chairwoman of The Jerusalem Ballet. In this role, she explores the intersection of social sciences and the arts. In 2025, she facilitated an international collaboration between The Jerusalem Ballet and Florida Atlantic University, including a student exchange program and the company's American debut.

== Her work ==
Since 2005, she has taught how to recognize sexual abuse of children, conduct qualitative research, and report on the phenomenon. In addition, Giladi consults with a variety of organizations and conducts training about sexual abuse at an early age.

She has authored prevention programs for personal empowerment, mutual respect and preventing sexual harassment amongst children and youth for use with children aged 4 to 7 and 8 to 10 and 11 to 13 and from 14 to 18, and a play about sexual harassment among youth.

The prevention programs are operated through the Voice of the Child Association and widely used in kindergartens as well as in public and private schools throughout Israel.

Clients served by the association include young children with visual impairments, children from various religious backgrounds, new immigrant children, especially from Ethiopia, and Arab children.

In 2011 in Voice of the Child Association Honor certificated from the Israeli Ministry of Education.

Giladi has spoken about sexual abuse at an early age to the Knesset (Israeli Parliament), in the Israeli Supreme Court and at international conferences in the United States and England.

She trains family judges, physicians, nurses, psychologists, educators and school administrators, social workers, parents and children about the phenomenon.

In her work at the NCJW at the Hebrew University, Giladi is also the National HIPPY (Home Instruction for Parents and Preschool Youngsters) Director in Israel. HIPPY Israel currently serves over 3000 families a year. Giladi oversees seven prevention programs educating at-risk families before the birth of the child until the child is seven years old in approximately 90 municipalities. Giladi initiated and runs three different courses in Ultra-Orthodox, Bedouin and Ethiopian communities designed to enable women to enter the workforce in early childhood centers. Two new courses recently opened for the Ultra-Orthodox women training them to become directors of early childhood day care centers. In addition to working with Arab, Druze and Bedouin Israelis, Giladi has recently started working with Arab speaking refugees currently seeking safety in countries across Europe and Canada.

In August 2008, Giladi received the Certificate of Recognition from ICASH – International Coalition against Sexual Abuse – for her contribution to Sexual abuse Research. In February 2010' Giladi won an award from the ISS – Israel Sociological Society – for being a Practicing Sociologist for Young Children and Youth.

== Personal life ==
Giladi is married and a mother to three children.

== Fellowship ==
- Member in the Committee for Prevention of Sexual Harassment the Hebrew University of Jerusalem
- Salzburg Global Seminar
- Global Seminar of RSA (Royal society for the Encouragement of Arts, Manufacture and Commerce) London, Englandmber
- Academic Advisor at JDC-Joint, Israel.
