= Alfred von Martin =

German historian

Alfred von Martin (July 24, 1882 – June 11, 1979) was a German historian and sociologist and one of the last representatives of the founding years of German sociology to teach and publish in the Federal Republic of Germany. His diagnoses of the times are based on historical sociology and cultural sociology. Alfred von Martin published scholarly texts over a period of seventy years. Von Martin was first educated on the family estate by a private tutor, Dr. A. Schlemm, an expert in classical languages and antiquity. He transferred to the humanistic Gymnasium in Görlitz for a few years before taking his final examinations. Von Martin studied history and numerous related subjects at the University of Freiburg, Heidelberg University, Leipzig University, Friedrich Wilhelm University of Berlin, the University of Florence, and Sapienza University of Rome, graduating with a doctorate from the University of Freiburg in 1912.

== Life ==
=== German Empire ===
Alfred von Martin's father, Friedrich Martin, was a partner with Hermann Fölsch in the company "Fölsch & Martin", running saltpetre works in Taltal (Chile) and having an office in Hamburg. His maternal grandfather, the landowner Otto Roestel, was also active in the saltpetre industry. After Alfred von Martin's birth, Friedrich Martin acquired a manor in Rothenburg an der Neisse. According to the Genealogical Handbook of the Nobility, he promptly established a fideicommissum for the estate in the vicinity of Rothenburg Castle. Alfred von Martin was ennobled in 1907. The estate in Upper Lusatia was subsequently taken over by his younger brother Hans von Martin.

Extensive real estate holdings provided Alfred von Martin with financial security throughout his life. He was educated by a private tutor on the estate until he entered grammar school. After graduating from high school in Görlitz, he studied law and political science at the University of Breslau, the University of Lausanne, the University of Tübingen, and the Ludwig-Maximilians-Universität München. He completed his first degree in 1906 with a doctorate in law. He then studied history at the University of Freiburg (with Friedrich Meinecke), Heidelberg University, Leipzig University, the Friedrich Wilhelm University of Berlin, the University of Florence, and Sapienza University of Rome. He completed his studies in 1913 with a doctorate (Dr. phil.). While serving as a reserve lieutenant during World War I, von Martin completed his habilitation in medieval and modern history at the University of Frankfurt am Main in 1915.

=== Weimar Republic and Third Reich ===
After the war, he was appointed associate professor at the University of Frankfurt am Main. He taught history at the Ludwig-Maximilians-Universität München from 1924. In 1931, he moved to the University of Göttingen as an honorary professor and became director of the newly established "Sociological Seminar".

In 1932, due to political circumstances, he took a permanent leave of absence from the university (for which he had received no compensation as an honorary professor), retired to the Ludwig-Maximilians-Universität München, and went into the so-called inner emigration to become an independent scholar. In his own words, he was not prepared to "continue lecturing after the abolition of the freedom to teach, especially since the teaching job was one without material compensation. Had it been otherwise, I would never have lectured against my convictions, but I might have sought out subjects that were as 'harmless' as possible; however, I had no reason to engage in such evasions".

He spent the next few years studying the Renaissance and Jacob Burckhardt. Even before 1933, his interpretation of Machiavelli characterized the "faith of the leader" as decadent, with a clear contemporary reference:

"Machiavelli himself does not believe in the appointed (but not only 'appointed' by him) savior ... He warms himself (like Hitler again) to the type of the adventurous, daring lansquenet ... This doctor's diagnosis is not wrong, but his etiology is one-eyed. No longer in possession of a sound conception of what health means, he prescribes the fascist poison as a cure for the sick age: pure political actionism - outside of a genuine order of values".

His book Nietzsche und Burckhardt (Munich 1941) was a clear statement against the Nazi regime, leading to violent attacks against him in the Nazi press. The first edition of his book Religion in the Life and Thought of Jacob Burckhardt (Munich 1942) was confiscated by the Gestapo, and he may have escaped arrest only by chance. He communicated with members of the White Rose resistance group, and Hans Scholl visited him several times in the spring of 1942.

=== After World War II ===
In 1945, von Martin returned to publishing and sought a position as a university lecturer. World War II had caused him to lose all his real estate holdings, the source of his previous financial independence. He was no longer able to get established in academic sociology, even though he had become an honorary member of the German Sociological Association.

Dirk Kaesler characterizes von Martin as follows:

"In keeping with his skeptical attitude, he remained more of a loner at the university after 1945. A consistent theme in his late work was the tension between society and individual freedom."

He was denied permission to return to the University of Göttingen. It was alleged that he was an unreliable colleague and that he had "disappointed the faculty" by resigning. However, he lectured as an outsider in his discipline, first as an assistant professor at the Technical University of Munich (1946–1948), then as an associate professor, and finally as a full professor emeritus at the Ludwig-Maximilians-Universität München (1948–1959). There he held the newly created chair of sociology until Emerich K. Francis took over after a long period of educational controversy in Bavarian politics.

During this time, he wrote the first systematic description of sociology in the Federal Republic of Germany (1956). After retiring from academic teaching at the age of 78, he produced a comprehensive work despite his age.

Rainer Lepsius wrote about Alfred von Martin in an obituary:

"He consciously placed himself at the service of the values he knew, skeptical of all power and contemptuous of the techniques and tactics of conformity, preferring personal independence to institutional influence."

== Sociological work ==
=== Sociology of the middle classes (entrepreneurs and intellectuals) ===
Much of von Martins' sociological work can be read as a preparation for his planned, but never realized, Sociology of the bourgeoisie. Based on his main work, Sociology of the Renaissance (also translated into English, Spanish, Dutch and Japanese), his historic-sociological analyses of the era describe the bourgeoisie as the main actor in the dynamics of capitalist development. In his view, the Renaissance marked the transition from the static and contemplative way of life of the Middle Ages to the activity of the modern economic man. Von Martin also saw the modern Western bourgeoisie as consisting of two types, the entrepreneur and the intellectual. He attributed to both the same characteristics that did not exist in the Middle Ages: individuality and rationality.

The emergence of the bureaucratic state and large corporations reshaped the original type of citizen in terms of his actions and behavior. According to von Martin, World War I marked the final turning point toward a "post-bourgeois society". The post-bourgeois individual had become dependent to the detriment of his individuality and this was reflected in the pursuit of advancement within organizations (no longer through independent entrepreneurial activity), in conformism, and in consumerism. The "cultural intelligentsia" (Bildungsbürgertum) also declined in importance and became a purely technical intelligentsia and officialdom.

=== Criticism of contemporary sociology ===
This trend toward objectification gained momentum after the World War II and also affected sociology's understanding of science. Alfred von Martin emphasized that:

"Contrary to all those scientific tendencies that - partly collectivist, partly Americanizing in character - strive for a sociology in which the human being "does not exist" or at least only as a given object of quasi-technical social manipulation, the broad factual current that tends in this direction is, as a problem complex of contemporary sociology, a particularly weighty topic. But it is precisely today's crisis-ridden threat to the values of personality that can be seen as a reason to see the social in terms of the human. However, sociology as a science has nothing to do with worldview: "functionalism", but also "social roles", are (or betrays) a certain worldview, even if one does not know it and would deny it."

=== Analysis of the class society ===
In addition to the sociology of the bourgeoisie - and especially the sociology of intellectuals - von Martin was also concerned with the analysis of social class after 1945. In contrast to Helmut Schelsky (and other leading sociologists of the first postwar decades), he denied the existence of a leveled bourgeois society.

In addition to the sociology of the Bürgertums - and especially the sociology of intellectuals - von Martin was also concerned with the analysis of social class after 1945. In contrast to Helmut Schelsky (and other leading sociologists of the first postwar decades), he denied the existence of a leveled bourgeois society. Although contemporary society had undergone considerable changes compared to 19th century capitalism (organizational forms of enterprises, differentiation rather than standardization of the workforce, social security), he argued that this was not the case:

"The essential moments of class antagonism still exist: the division between those who plan and order "above" and those who obey and execute "below," and the latent conflict of interests with the relationship of domination."

=== Dealing with National Socialism ===
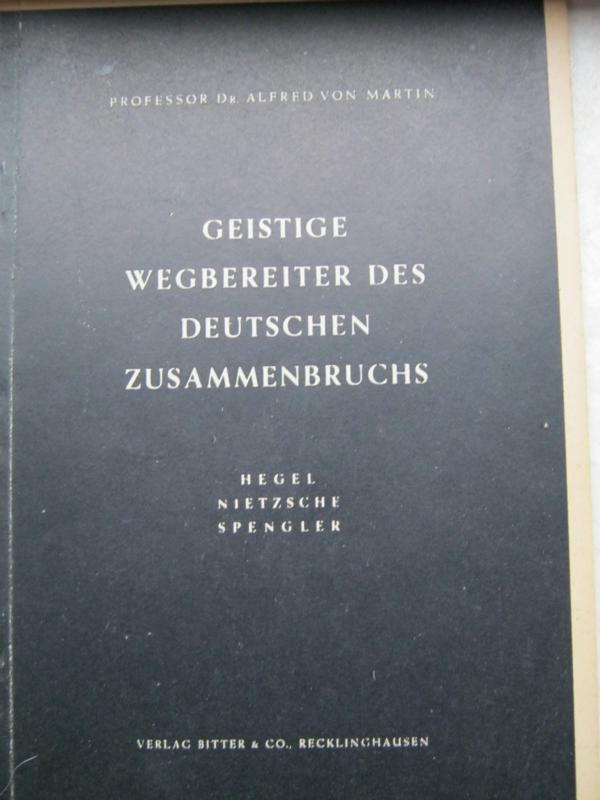
Script from 1948.

Volker Kruse summarizes von Martin's diagnosis of National Socialism in five sentences:

- The National Socialist dictatorship was only possible because it was widely accepted by the population;
- this acceptance was only possible because of a lack of awareness of values;
- the lack of awareness of values was the result of a mental confusion among the German intelligentsia, which spread to the entire German people;
- the intellectual confusion was caused by Hegel, Nietzsche and Spengler;
- a disposition to extreme political outbursts was ingrained in the German national character.

In contrast to almost all of his colleagues, von Martin actively sought to critically and sociologically examine National Socialism through publications and lectures in the postwar years. He called for the moral commitment of the social scientist, for which he was explicitly singled out by René König among German sociologists.

=== Reception in sociology ===
Alfred von Martin's late work represents an "almost forgotten beginning of postwar sociology." With his exclusively humanistic approach to sociology and his systematic, encyclopedic orientation, von Martin was isolated in the academic world from the beginning. Other representatives of humanistic sociology, such as Hans Freyer, came from the Leipzig School of Sociology and were far removed from Martin's avowed opposition to German nationalist ideology. He was also out of step with the times in his assertion of humanity in the face of specialized science.

With his exclusively humanistic approach to sociology and his systematic, encyclopedic orientation, he was isolated in the academic world from the outset. Other representatives of humanistic sociology, such as Hans Freyer, came from the Leipzig School of Sociology and were far removed from Martin's avowed opposition to German nationalist ideology. He was also out of step with the times in his claim to humanity in the face of specialized science. However, as Kruse points out, thirty years later there were no serious errors to be found in von Martin's contemporary diagnostic work on Western postwar society.

== Commitment to ecumenism and political Christianity ==
Alfred von Martin was a devout Christian of the Protestant denomination and an advocate of Una Sancta (One Holy Church). He became a member of the High Church Union in 1922 and was its second chairman in 1923/24. Along with the High Church Union, he pursued the goal of strengthening a sacramental and Catholic understanding of the church within the Protestant churches. This effort is expressed in the formula "Evangelical Catholicity". Because of increasing disputes with a "Prussian group", he left the High Church Union together with the entire "Catholic group" in the fall of 1925 and founded the "High Church Ecumenical Alliance" with Karl Buchheim. Von Martin became editor of the new association's magazine, "Una Sancta," published from 1925 to 1928. The journal was then renamed "Religious Reflection," in which he also published. Von Martin eventually converted to the Roman Catholic Church.

In 1922, he was elected to the board of the Catholic Centre, where efforts were made to develop the party into an interdenominational Christian party. He later left the Centre.

== Publications (selection) ==
- Über die Frage des Beginnes der Legislaturperiode des deutschen Reichstages und des preußischen Landtags. Breslau 1906 (at the same time: legal dissertation).
- Coluccio Salutatis' Traktat "Vom Tyrannen". Eine kulturgeschichtliche Untersuchung. Freiburg im Breisgau 1913 (at the same time: philosophical dissertation).
- Mittelalterliche Welt- und Lebensanschauung im Spiegel der Schriften Coluccio Salutatis. Oldenbourg, Munich/Berlin 1913.
- Coluccio Salutati und das humanistische Lebensideal. Ein Kapitel aus der Genesis der Renaissance. Teubner, Berlin/Leipzig 1916; Reprint of the 1916 edition, Gerstenberg, Hildesheim 1973, ISBN 3-8067-0121-0.
- Romantischer Katholizismus und katholische Romantik. In: Hochland 23 (1925), p. 323–327.
- Soziologie der Renaissance. Zur Physiognomik und Rhythmik bürgerlicher Kultur. Enke, Stuttgart 1932; Second, modified and enlarged edition, Knecht, Frankfurt am Main 1949; 3rd edition, Beck, Munich 1974, ISBN 3-406-04906-0; 4th edition: Soziologie der Renaissance und weitere Schriften, edited of Richard Faber and Christine Holste, Springer VS, Wiesbaden 2016, ISBN 978-3-658-10448-1, therein pp. 1–116: Sociology of the Renaissance (London 1944); span.: Sociología del Renacimiento (1970, ²1977, ³2005).
- Nietzsche und Burckhardt. Reinhardt, Munich 1941 (4th edition, Erasmus-Publisher, Munich 1947).
- Die Religion in Jakob Burkhardts Leben und Denken. Eine Studie zum Thema Humanismus und Christentum, Reinhardt, Munich 1942; 2nd, enlarged edition as: Die Religion Jacob Burckhardts. Eine Studie zum Thema Humanismus und Christentum. Erasmus-Publisher, Munich 1947.
- Geistige Wegbereiter des deutschen Zusammenbruchs (Hegel, Nietzsche, Spengler). Bitter, Recklinghausen 1948.
- Geist und Gesellschaft. Soziologische Skizzen zur europäischen Kulturgeschichte. Knecht, Frankfurt am Main 1948.
- Der heroische Nihilismus und seine Überwindung. Ernst Jüngers Weg durch die Krise. Scherpe-Publisher, Krefeld 1948.
- Ordnung und Freiheit. Materialien und Reflexionen zu Grundfragen des Soziallebens. Knecht, Frankfurt am Main 1956.
- Soziologie. Die Hauptgebiete im Überblick. Duncker & Humblot, Berlin 1956.
- Mensch und Gesellschaft heute. Knecht, Frankfurt am Main 1965.
- Im Zeichen der Humanität. Soziologische Streifzüge. Knecht, Frankfurt am Main 1974, ISBN 3-7820-0324-1.
- Macht als Problem. Hegel und seine politische Wirkung. Academy of Sciences and Literature, Mainz 1976, ISBN 3-515-02378-X.
- Die Krisis des bürgerlichen Menschen. Selected and edited by Richard Faber and Christine Holste. Springer VS, Wiesbaden 2019, ISBN 978-3-658-21572-9.

== Bibliography ==
- Richard Faber, Perdita Ladwig (Ed.): Gesellschaft und Humanität. Der Kultursoziologe Alfred von Martin (1882–1979). Königshausen & Neumann, Würzburg 2013, ISBN 3-8260-5123-8.
- Margret Funke-Schmitt-Rink: Martin, Alfred von. In: Wilhelm Bernsdorf, Horst Knospe (Ed.): Internationales Soziologenlexikon.Vol. 2, Enke, Stuttgart 1984, p. 547.
- Claudius Härpfer: Zwischen Geschichte und Soziologie. Einige Bemerkungen zur Verortung Alfred von Martins. In: Oliver Römer, Ina Alber-Armentat (Ed.): Erkundungen im Historischen. Soziologie in Göttingen. Geschichte – Entwicklungen – Perspektiven. Springer VS, Wiesbaden 2019, ISBN 978-3-658-22220-8, p. 61–82 (Online version).
- Dirk Käsler: Martin, Alfred von. In: Neue Deutsche Biographie (NDB). Band 16, Duncker & Humblot, Berlin 1990, ISBN 3-428-00197-4, p. 282 f. (Digital copy).
- Volker Kruse: Historisch-soziologische Zeitdiagnose in Westdeutschland nach 1945. Eduard Heimann, Alfred von Martin, Hans Freyer. suhrkamp handbook science, Frankfurt am Main 1994.
- Perdita Ladwig: Das Renaissancebild deutscher Historiker 1898–1933 (= Campus Forschung. Volume 859). Campus-Publisher, Frankfurt am Main et al. 2004, ISBN 3-593-37467-6, p. 202–277.
- Mario Rainer Lepsius: Alfred von Martin † (24. Juli 1882 – 11. Juni 1979). In: Kölner Zeitschrift für Soziologie und Sozialpsychologie. 31st year, 1979, pp. 826–828.
- Günter Maschke: Zum Tode von Alfred von Martin. Der Humanismus und die Moderne. In: Frankfurter Allgemeine Zeitung June 16, 1979, p. 25.
- Stephan Moebius: Soziologie in der Zwischenkriegszeit in Deutschland. In: Karl Acham, Stephan Moebius (Ed.): Soziologie der Zwischenkriegszeit. Ihre Hauptströmungen und zentralen Themen im deutschen Sprachraum. Springer VS, Wiesbaden 2021, ISBN 978-3-658-31398-2, p. 31–176.
- Sven Papcke: Gesellschaftsdiagnosen, Klassische Texte der deutschen Soziologie im 20. Jahrhundert (= Reihe Campus. Band 1040). Campus, Frankfurt am Main et al. 1991, ISBN 3-593-34432-7, p. 180–197.
- Anikó Szabó: Vertreibung, Rückkehr, Wiedergutmachung. Göttinger Hochschullehrer im Schatten des Nationalsozialismus. Mit einer biographischen Dokumentation der entlassenen und verfolgten Hochschullehrer: Universität Göttingen – TH Braunschweig – TH Hannover – Tierärztliche Hochschule Hannover (= Veröffentlichungen des Arbeitskreises Geschichte des Landes Niedersachsen (nach 1945). Volume 15). Wallstein, Göttingen 2000, ISBN 3-89244-381-5, p. 119–122.

=== Genealogy/Vita ===
- Gothaisches Genealogisches Taschenbuch, Alter Adel und Briefadel, Justus Perthes, Gotha. Editions of 1927, 1929, 1940 (at the same time: Nobility Register of the German Nobility Association).
- Hans Friedrich von Ehrenkrook, Friedrich Wilhelm Euler: Genealogisches Handbuch des Adels (GHdA). B: Briefadel, Volume 1 (= Gesamtreihe GHdA. Volume 9), C. A. Starke, Glücksburg/Ostsee 1954, p. 284 f. ISSN 0435-2408.
