= M. Rainer Lepsius =

German sociologist (1928–2014)

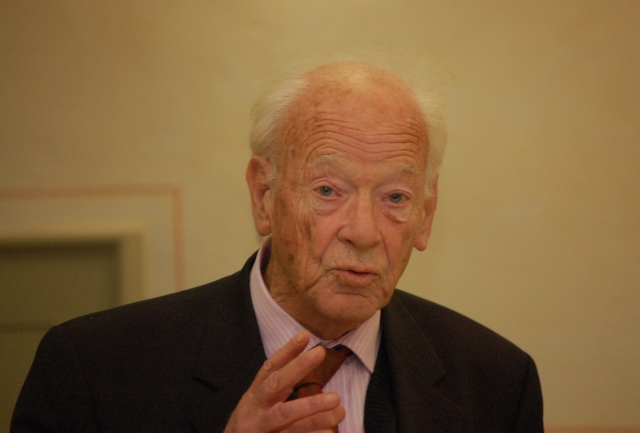
- 2006
- Born: Mario Rainer Lepsius; 8 May 1928; Rio de Janeiro, Brazil
- Died: 2 October 2014; Weinheim, Baden-Württemberg, Germany
- Education: Ludwig-Maximilians-Universität München; University of Cologne
- Occupations: Sociologist; Writer; Editor
- Spouse: Renate Meyer (1927–2004)
- Children: Oliver Lepsius
- Parent: Wilhelm Lepsius (1890–1942)

Mario Rainer Lepsius (8 May 1928 – 2 October 2014) was a German sociologist. A particular interest of his was the work of Max Weber; he was prominent among the co-compilers of the (eventually) 47-volume edition of the Complete Works of Weber.

== Life ==
Mario Rainer Lepsius was born in Rio de Janeiro, at that time the capital of Brazil. His Portuguese first name reflected the country where the family lived when he was born, while his second name reflected the German provenance of the family. After moving to Germany he would stop using the name Mario, substituting the initial M, which is why most sources identify him as M. Rainer Lepsius.

Lepsius came from a prominent Berlin family. His father, Wilhelm Lepsius (1890–1942) had a doctorate degree in law, and by the time Lepisus was born, was working for Schering AG, a large pharmaceutical company headquartered in Berlin. His mother, the daughter of a Munich judge, came from a middle class Protestant Franconian family, with a number of lawyers, doctors, and pastors among her ancestors. In 1934, when Lepsius was six years old, his family relocated to Madrid where he first attended school. Two years later, in 1936, his family returned to Germany, settling in Munich where Lepsius spent a majority of his childhood. While in Munich, at the age of fourteen his father passed. On May 8, 1945, his seventeenth birthday, Lepsius was in Munich when he witnessed the capitulation of the German army, marking the formal end to the Second World War.

Between 1947 and 1952, he studied history, social economics (Volkswirtschaftslehre) and sociology at the Ludwig-Maximilians-Universität München (LMU) and the University of Cologne. He received his first degree from LMU in 1950. His doctorate, also from LMU, followed in 1955. At LMU, he was able to obtain a grounding a sociology from Alfred von Martin. At the University of Cologne, he was one of the so-called "young Turks" drawn to the ideas of René König, and from this point his academic focus was almost exclusively on sociology. Gerhard Weisser triggered his interest in town planning. In autumn 1951, during an extended stay in London, he was able to pursue his studies at the London School of Economics. It was also in London that he met Renate Meyer whom he would later marry.

After this, Friedrich Lütge offered him a post as seminar assistant in Economic History back at LMU, which made Lepsius and Knut Borchardt colleagues. He was also commissioned to produce a study on the social position of the Master or Foreman (Meister) in industrial management structures, which led to the creation of contacts with industrial sociologists such as Theo Pirker, Burkart Lutz and Friedrich Weltz.

In 1955–56, Lepsius won a Fulbright scholarship which led to a year spent at Columbia University in New York, studying with Robert K. Merton, whom he found a "lucid teacher" and Paul Lazarsfeld as his "student advisor." At the end of his year he was offered a position as a research assistant by Reinhard Bendix at University of California, Berkeley, but after a certain amount of soul-searching decided to return to West Germany and participate in the postwar reconstruction of the country's academic base. Between 1957 and 1963, he worked for his former tutor Alfred von Martin as a research assistant at the newly established Institute for Sociology at LMU. He played a central role both in the day-to-day teaching and as an administrator, working closely with the institute director Emerich K. Francis who, like Lepsius, had been persuaded by Alfred von Martin to return from the United States.

In 1963, Lepsius obtained his habilitation (post-doctoral qualification) at LMU for a piece of work critiquing the Functionalist Theory of social organization. He subsequently expressed regret that the dissertation had never been published: however, in 2015, it was published posthumously, complete with a foreword by his son, Oliver Lepsius and an introduction by his fellow Weber scholar, Wolfgang Schluchter.

1963 was also the year when he moved from LMU to the National Economic Academy (Staatliche Wirtschaftshochschule) in Mannheim (rebranded in 1967 as the University of Mannheim). Here, he held a full professorship in Sociology until 1981 when he moved again. In 1981, he took a leading position at the then-threatened Sociology department at Heidelberg University, where he held an equivalent professorship until he became an emeritus professor in 1993.

Lepsius lost his ability to speak after a stroke in July 2014. He died in Weinheim after a second stroke on 2 October 2014.

== Memberships ==
Between 1971 and 1974, Lepsius chaired the German Sociological Association. He was a member of several learned institutions; from 1977 a full member of the Heidelberg Academy of Sciences and Humanities, from 1992 a corresponding member of the Bavarian Academy of Sciences and Humanities, and from 2004 a foreign member of the Turin Academy of Sciences and Humanities.

== Reputation and influence ==
Lepsius was considered one of the leading West German researchers and theoreticians of contemporary society. Like most sociologists of the postwar generation, he started out as an industrial sociologist, and like many of the better known sociologists of that generation, he was a member of the Expert Committee for Industrial Sociology at the German Sociological Association (Fachausschuss für Industriesoziologie der Deutschen Gesellschaft für Soziologie).

Lepsius had a particular interest in the work of Max Weber: he was prominent among the co-compilers of the (eventually) 47-volume edition of the Complete Works of Weber. His research work also embraced both historical and contemporary social structure. He also worked extensively on political sociology and on the European Union. Lepsius powerfully influenced the political culture through his work on the social environment.

== Writing and publications ==
Lists of publications are included in: Adalbert Hepp, Martina Löw (eds.): M. Rainer Lepsius. Soziologie als Profession. Campus Verlag, Frankfurt am Main/New York 2008, ISBN 3-593-38322-5, pp. 161–178 and Steffen Sigmund, Gert Albert, Agathe Bienfait, Mateusz Stachura (eds.): Soziale Konstellation und historische Perspektive. Festschrift für M. Rainer Lepsius. VS Verlag, Wiesbaden 2008, ISBN 3-531-15852-X, pp. 468–483.

- Soziologie und Soziologen. Aufsätze zur Institutionalisierung der Soziologie in Deutschland. Edited by Oliver Lepsius. Mohr Siebeck, Tübingen 2017, ISBN 3-16-155624-0
- Max Weber und seine Kreise. Essays. Tübingen 2016, ISBN 3-16-154738-1 .
- Soziale Schichtung in der industriellen Gesellschaft. With an introduction by Wolfgang Schluchter . Mohr Siebeck, Tübingen 2015, ISBN 3-16-154168-5 (also: Habil.-Schr., Munich 1963).
- Institutionalisierung politischen Handelns. Analysen zur DDR, Wiedervereinigung und Europäischen Union. Springer VS, Wiesbaden 2014, ISBN 3-658-01325-7
- Demokratie in Deutschland. Soziologisch-historische Konstellationsanalysen. Ausgewählte Aufsätze. [Selected essays] . Vandenhoeck & Ruprecht, Göttingen 1993, ISBN 3-525-35763-X
- Interessen, Ideen und Institutionen. Westdeutscher Verlag, Opladen 1990, ISBN 3-531-11879-X (2nd edition. VS Verlag, Wiesbaden 2009, ISBN 3-531-16581-X
- Extremer Nationalismus. Strukturbedingungen vor der nationalsozialistischen Machtergreifung. Kohlhammer, Stuttgart 1966.
- "Parteiensystem und Sozialstruktur. Zum Problem der Demokratisierung der deutschen Gesellschaft." In: Wilhelm Abel, Knut Borchardt, Hermann Kellenbenz, Wolfgang Zorn (Hrsg.): Wirtschaft, Geschichte und Wirtschaftsgeschichte. Festschrift zum 65. Geburtstag von Friedrich Lütge. Fischer, Stuttgart 1966, DNB 458669210, pp. 371–393. Reprinted in: Gerhard A. Ritter (ed.): Deutsche Parteien vor 1918. Kiepenheuer & Witsch, Cologne 1973, ISBN 3-462-00958-3, pp. 56–80.
- “Sozialstruktur und soziale Schichtung in der Bundesrepublik Deutschland.” In: Die Zweite Republik. 25 Jahre Bundesrepublik Deutschland – Eine Bilanz, edited by Richard Löwenthal and Hans-Peter Schwarz. Stuttgart: Seewald Verlag, 1974. pp. 272–275.

Complete Works of Max Weber

Horst Baier, Gangolf Hübinger, M. Rainer Lepsius, Wolfgang J. Mommsen, Wolfgang Schluchter, Johannes Winckelmann (eds.): Max-Weber-Gesamtausgabe (MWG). 47 Bände. Mohr-Siebeck, Tübingen 1984–2019.
