= Alfred Vierkandt =

German social psychologist

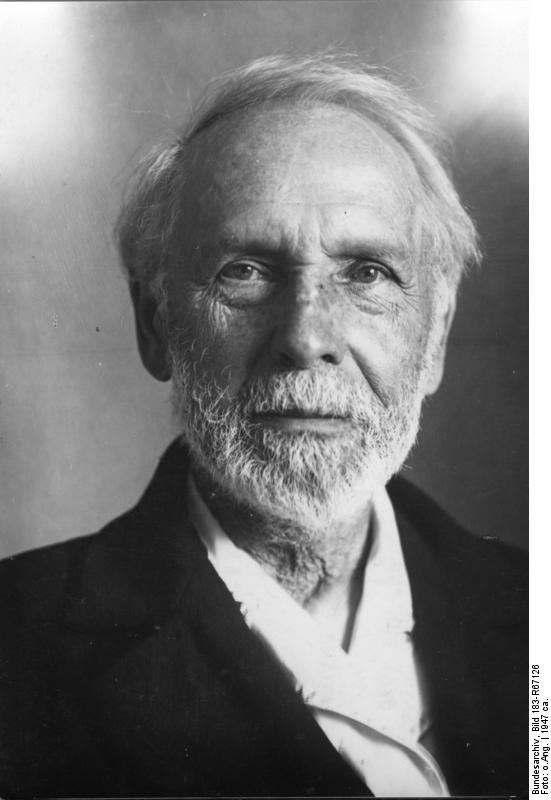
Alfred Vierkandt.

Alfred Vierkandt (4 June 1867 – 24 April 1953) was a German sociologist, ethnographer, social psychologist, social philosopher and philosopher of history. He is known for a broad and phenomenological Gesellschaftslehre promulgated in the 1920s, and for his formal (pure)) sociology.

Vierkandt was born in Hamburg. He first studied mathematics, physics, geography, völkerpsychologie, and philosophy at Leipzig University and habilitated at Technische Hochschule Brunswick in geography. Moving his venia legendi to the University of Berlin he was made Dozent in ethnology, eventually becoming Professor of Sociology at the University of Berlin in 1913. Previously, Vierkandt had been one of the founders, in 1909, of the Deutsche Gesellschaft für Soziologie.

The first German-language "Concise Dictionary of Sociology" was released in 1931 under Vierkandt's direction.

Upon his retirement in 1934 at the University of Berlin Vierkandt was barred from lecturing (Vorlesungsverbot), but took up his teaching there anew from 1945 or 1946. He was chairman of the Kant Society (Kant-Gesellschaft) from 1945.

Alfred Vierkandt died, aged 85, in Berlin.

The Social Science Archive Konstanz as part of the Communication, Information and Media Center (KIM) of the University of Konstanz holds a number of his papers and materials.

== Work ==
- Naturvölker und Kulturvölker. Ein Beitrag zur Socialpsychologie (1896)
- Die Stetigkeit im Kulturwandel: eine soziologische Studie (1908)
- Allgemeine Verfassungs- und Verwaltungsgeschichte (1911) with Leopold Wenger and others
- Machtverhältnis und Machtmoral (1916)
- Staat und Gesellschaft in der Gegenwart: Eine Einführung in das staatsbürgerliche Denken und in die politische Bewegung unserer Zeit (1916)
- 'Programm einer formalen Gesellschaftslehre' [Program for a formal theory of society], Kölner Vierteljahrshefte, ser. A, Vol. 1, No. 1 (Cologne, 1921)
- Gesellschaftslehre: Hauptprobleme der philosophischen Soziologie (1923)
- Der Dualismus im modernen Weltbild (1923)
- Der geistig-sittliche Gehalt des neueren Naturrechtes (1927)
- Allgemeine Verfassungs und Verwaltungsgeschichte (1928)
- Handwörterbuch der Soziologie (1931) editor
- Familie, Volk und Staat in ihren gesellschaftlichen Lebensvorgängen: Eine Einführung in die Gesellschaftslehre (1936)
- Kleine Gesellschaftslehre (1949)
