= Alphons Silbermann =

- Born: 11 August 1909; Cologne, German Empire
- Died: 4 March 2000 (aged 90)
- Education: University of Cologne; University of Freiburg; University of Grenoble
- Occupations: Sociologist; musicologist; entrepreneur; publicist
- Known for: Member of the Cologne School; founder of the Institut für Massenkommunikation

Alphons Silbermann (August 11, 1909 – March 4, 2000) was a German Jewish sociologist, musicologist, entrepreneur and publicist.

Born in Cologne, he studied musicology, sociology and law at the Universities of Cologne, Freiburg i. Br. and Grenoble. After he gained his doctorate (Dr. jur.), the rise of Nazism led Silbermann to emigrate to the Netherlands and 1938 from Amsterdam via Paris, where he worked as a waiter, to Sydney. In Australia he started as a dishwasher but went soon from rags to riches with his own fast food restaurant Silver's Food Bars. He initiated the first fastfood chain of Australia, becoming a successful entrepreneur.

His academic career started in 1944 in Sydney at the New South Wales State Conservatorium of Music. As an empirical culture-sociologist, he went back to Europe (especially Paris) in 1951. In 1958 René König brought him back to Cologne, where he taught at the university. In 1964 he was called to the University of Lausanne as a successor of Vilfredo Pareto and later at the University of Bordeaux (1974–1979).

Alphons Silbermann was a member of the "Cologne School" (Kölner Schule) along with René König and others. He was one of the editors of the Kölner Zeitschrift für Soziologie und Sozialpsychologie (KZfSS) and founded the Institut für Massenkommunikation (Institute of Mass Communication). He was an important German pioneer of empirical methods, as against the ideological biases of many contemporary colleagues like his favorite opponent Theodor W. Adorno.

== Bibliography ==
- 1949: ...Of musical things. Sydney
- 1959: Musik, Rundfunk und Hörer. Die soziologischen Aspekte der Musik am Rundfunk. VS Verlag für Sozialwissenschaften. ISBN 978-3-663-00798-2
- 1963: The Sociology of Music. London. ISBN 978-0-8371-9455-4
- 1963: Vom Wohnen der Deutschen. Eine soziologische Studie über das Wohnerlebnis. VS Verlag für Sozialwissenschaften. ISBN 978-3-322-98288-9
- 1966: Bildschirm und Wirklichkeit. Ullstein. ISBN 978-3-550-07213-0
- 1968: Vorteile und Nachteile des kommerziellen Fernsehens: Eine soziologische Studie. Econ-Verlag.
- 1969: Morale chez Vilfredo Pareto. In: Cahiers Vilfredo Pareto, 18; Lausanne.
- 1973: Empirische Kunstsoziologie: eine Einf. mit kommentierter Bibliographie. Enke. ISBN 978-3-432-02287-1
- 1973: Mediensoziologie: Film. Econ Verlag. ISBN 978-3-430-18493-9
- 1973: Mediensozialogie: Rundfunk. Econ Verlag. ISBN 978-3-450-18923-5
- 1973: Soziologie der Massenkommunikation. Stuttgart.
- 1981: Communication de Masse. Eléments de Sociologie empirique; Paris.
- 1981: Der ungeliebte Jude. Zur Soziologie des Antisemitismus. Edition Interfrom. ISBN 978-3-7201-5134-4
- 1981: Einführung in die Literatursoziologie. Oldenbourg. ISBN 978-3-486-19951-2
- 1984: Was ist jüdischer Geist? Fromm Druckhaus A. ISBN 3720151670
- 1985: Der Übersetzer: eine berufs- und literatursoziologische Untersuchung. Harrassowitz. ISBN 978-3-447-02558-4
- 1986: Comics and Visual Culture : Research Studies from Ten Countries. Editor with: H.D. Dryoff. Munich. ISBN 3-598-10604-1
- 1986: Lübbes Mahler-Lexikon. Lübbe. ISBN 978-3-404-61271-0
- 1989: Verwandlungen.' Eine Autobiographie. (Autobiography). Berlin.
- 1991: Das imaginäre Tagebuch des Herrn Jacques Offenbach. Piper. ISBN 978-3-492-18317-8
- 1991: Neues vom Wohnen der Deutschen (West). Verlag Wissenschaft und Politik. ISBN 978-3-8046-8765-3
- 1993: Badezimmer in Ostdeutschland: eine soziologische Studie. Verlag Wissenschaft und Politik. ISBN 978-3-8046-8799-8
- 2000: Grovelling and Other Vices: The Sociology of Sycophancy. (Folklore). Translated by Ladislaus Lob. London.
