= Bie-modern =

Bie-modern is a theory of social form and historical development elaborated by the Chinese philosopher and aesthetician Wang Jianjiang. Specifically, bie-modern theory is based on the difference between the western dynamical development model, which distinguishes three cut-period phases (namely pre-modern, modern and post-modern), and the coexistence model of pre-modern and post-modern in current China. The aim of bie-modern theory is to identify and further explore the specificity of China's cultural, artistic and aesthetic status, especially compared to the western scenario. Bie-modern theory has produced an international discussion among scholars. Two research centres have been recently established, respectively the Chinese Bie-Modern Studies (CCBMS) at the Georgia Southwestern State University (2017) and the Bie-modern Research Centre at the University of Primorska (2019)
