= Akademie für Soziologie =

German sociology society

The Akademie für Soziologie (German for Academy for Sociology) is a scientific organization of social scientists that do empirical research in Germany. A call for the new organization was published in April 2017 with 112 signatories. The academy was founded in Mannheim in July of the same year. Its president is Thomas Hinz.

German sociologists were divided about whether a new organization was needed or divisive.

The academy is recognized by the German Research Foundation as one of the two societies for the empirical social sciences.

== Conference ==
- April 2018 in Munich – Wachsende Ungleichheit – gespaltene Gesellschaft? Aktuelle Beiträge der empirisch-analytischen Soziologie

== See also ==
- Deutsche Gesellschaft für Soziologie
- International Sociological Association
