= Helmut Schelsky =

German sociologist

Helmut Schelsky (14 October 1912 – 24 February 1984) was a German sociologist, the most influential in post-World War II Germany, well into the 1970s.

== Biography ==
Schelsky was born in Chemnitz, Saxony. He turned to social philosophy and even more to sociology, as elaborated at the University of Leipzig by Hans Freyer (the "Leipzig School"). Having earned his doctorate in 1935 (thesis [tr.]: The theory of community in the 1796 natural law by Fichte), in 1939 he qualified as a lecturer ("Habilitation") with a thesis on the political thought of Thomas Hobbes at the University of Königsberg. He was called up in 1941, so did not take up his first chair of Sociology at the (then German) Reichsuniversität Straßburg in 1944.

After the fall of the Third Reich in 1945, Schelsky joined the German Red Cross and formed its effective Suchdienst (service to trace down missing persons). In 1949 he became a professor at the Hamburg "Hochschule für Arbeit und Politik", in 1953 at Hamburg University, and in 1960 he went to the University of Münster. There he headed what was then the biggest West German centre for social research, in Dortmund.

In 1970, Schelsky accepted the position of a professor of sociology at the newly founded Bielefeld University, which created the only German full "Faculty of Sociology", as well as the "Centre of Interdisciplinarian Research" ("Zentrum für Interdisziplinäre Forschung" [ZiF] at Rheda), planned to be a 'German Harvard'. However, his new university changed very much, due to the years of student unrest all over Europe and North America, so Schelsky returned to Münster in anger in 1973 and stayed there for another five years. He wrote several more books, against the Utopian way to approach Sociology, as fostered by the Frankfurt School, and on the Sociology of Law.

He died in Münster in 1984.

== Schelsky and German sociology ==
The "Leipzig School" (the social philosopher Hans Freyer, the anthropologist Arnold Gehlen, the philosopher Gotthard Günther), rich in the talents of a first generation, was of strong theoretical influence on Schelsky. But Freyer also dreamt of building up a sociological think tank for the Third Reich - quite differently to most other sociologists, e. g. to the (outspoken) anti-Hitlerian Ferdinand Tönnies (University of Kiel) and to Leopold von Wiese (University of Cologne), and to the émigrés (e. g. to Karl Mannheim, and to the up-and-coming René König, Paul Lazarsfeld, Norbert Elias, Theodor Adorno, Rudolf Heberle, and Lewis A. Coser). Freyer's ambitions failed miserably, the Nazi power elite monopolizing ideology, but helped the talented student Schelsky in his first career steps.

After the Second World War, Schelsky became a star of applied sociology, due to his great gift of anticipating social and sociological developments. He published books on the theory of institutions, on social stratification, on the sociology of family, on the sociology of sexuality, on the sociology of youth, on Industrial Sociology, on the sociology of education, and on the sociology of the university system. In Dortmund, he made the Social Research Centre (″Sozialforschungsstelle″) a West German focus of empirical and theoretical studies, being especially gifted in finding and attracting first class social scientists, e.g. Dieter Claessens, Niklas Luhmann, and many more.

It helped that Schelsky was an outspoken liberal professor, without any ambition to create adherents. He helped another 17 sociologists qualify as lecturers (outnumbering in this any other professor in the Humanities and Social Sciences) and anticipated the boom in sociological chairs at German universities. Manning them, he was professionally even more successful than the outstanding remigrants René König (Cologne) and Otto Stammer (Berlin) - the Frankfurt School starting to be of influence only after 1968.

Schelsky was able to design Bielefeld University as an innovative institution of the highest academic quality, both in research and in thought. But the fact that his own university had moved away from his ideas hit him hard. His later books, criticizing ideological sociology (very much acclaimed now by conservative analysts) and on the sociology of law (quite influential in the Schools of Law) kept up his reputation as an outstanding thinker, but fell out of grace with younger sociologists. Moreover, his fascinating analyses, being of highest practical value, went out of date for the same reason; only by 2000 did new sociologists start to read him again.

== Selected bibliography ==
1. Theorie der Gemeinschaft nach Fichtes "Naturrecht" von 1796, 1935
2. Christliche Metaphysik und das Schicksal des modernen Bewusstseins, together with G. Günther, 1936
3. Thomas Hobbes. Eine politische Lehre, 1941
4. Das Freiheitswollen der Völker und die Idee des Planstaats, 1946
5. Zur Stabilität von Institutionen ([tr.] On the stability of institutions, 1952)
6. Wandlungen der deutschen Familie in der Gegenwart ( [tr.] Changes in present-day German families, 1953, 4th ed. 1960)
7. Soziologie der Sexualität ([tr.] Sociology of sexuality, 1955, 21st ed. 1977)
8. Die sozialen Folgen der Automatisierung ([tr.] The social outcomes of automation, 1957)
9. Die skeptische Generation, (a sociology of youth, 1957) 1975
10. Schule und Erziehung in der industriellen Gesellschaft ([tr.] School and education in the industrial society, 1957, 5th ed. 1965)
11. Ortsbestimmung der deutschen Soziologie, 1959
12. Der Mensch in der wissenschaftlichen Zivilisation, 1961
13. Einsamkeit und Freiheit. Die deutsche Universität und ihre Reformen, (1963) 1973
14. Die Arbeit tun die anderen. Klassenkampf und Priesterherrschaft der Intellektuellen (1975) ²1977
15. Die Soziologen und das Recht, 1980
