= Ernest Manheim =

Hungarian-American scholar and composer (1900–2002)

- Born: 27 January 1900; Budapest, Austria-Hungary
- Died: 28 July 2002 (aged 102); Kansas City, Missouri, United States
- Education: Eötvös Loránd University
- Scientific career
- Fields: Sociology, anthropology

Ernest Manheim (27 January 1900 – 28 July 2002), known as Ernő until 1920, Ernst until 1934, and then Ernest in the United States, was an American sociologist, anthropologist, and composer born in Hungary, at that time part of the Austro-Hungarian Empire.

== Life ==
Manheim attended a secondary school in Budapest from 1909 and graduated in 1917. Then he enrolled in the Military Academy for the Royal Hungarian Home Defense in Budapest and at the same time started chemistry studies at the der Royal Technical Joseph-Academy in Budapest. In 1918 he became a soldier in the Austro-Hungarian army ranking as a corporal.

After World War I he resumed his studies in chemistry and mathematics at the Budapest University, and additionally attended lectures in philosophy, music and literature.

From March to July 1919 Manheim was a volunteer in the Hungarian Soviet Republic or Republic of Councils founded by Béla Kun and was taken prisoner. He fled from the Romanian prison camp but could not stay in Budapest for long, since he had to face arrest as a supporter of the Soviet Republic. So he escaped to Austria in 1920, where he resumed his studies at the University of Vienna, first chemistry and physics and as of 1921 philosophy and history.

In 1923 he moved to Kiel to continue his studies of philosophy at the University of Kiel and also attended lectures by Ferdinand Tönnies in sociology. In Kiel Manheim became friends with Hans Freyer, a professor of philosophy and followed him to Leipzig, when Freyer received a call to a chair in sociology there. At the University of Leipzig Manheim completed his studies in philosophy and also attended lectures and seminars in economics and sociology. In 1928 he wrote his doctoral thesis Zur Logik des konkreten Begriffs (On the Logic of the Concrete Concept) under Hans Freyer and Theodor Litt.

From 1926 to 1933 Manheim worked as Freyer's assistant without a regular budget at the Leipzig university where he also offered tutorials of his own. Her also taught at the Leipzig Folk high school from 1926 to 1933. In 1932 Manheim submitted his habilitation thesis on Die Träger der öffentlichen Meinung, Studien zur Soziologie der Öffentlichkeit (The Makers of Public Opinion, Studies in the Sociology of the Public). Although the thesis had been accepted by the faculty, Manheim withdrew it on his own behalf in 1933. As a Jew he could not expect any chance of habilitation under the new Nazi government. With his family he moved to Budapest where he spent the second half of 1933, before, in December of that year, he went to London with his wife.

In the British capital be began studies of sociology and social anthropology at the University of London and at the London School of Economics and Political Science in 1934, passing his PhD exam in anthropology in 1937. Here he also wrote a voluminous manuscript for the Frankfurt Institute for Social Research, which got lost. In 1936, however, an abstract entitled Beiträge zu einer Geschichte der autoritären Familie (Contributions to the History of the Authoritarian Family) was published.

In 1937 Manheim emigrated to the US, and was naturalized as Ernest Manheim in 1943. In the beginning he worked as an assistant professor at the University of Chicago (Illinois) which at the time was the stronghold of American empirical social research. Since then a combination of theoretical competence based on philosophy and methods of empirical social research was the peculiarity in Manheim's scientific work. Since 1940 he was professor of sociology at the University of Kansas City, Missouri, which was then a private institution and was to become part of the University of Missouri System in 1963.

In 1955/56 he spent a year as guest professor in Graz and Vienna and in 1960/61 at the University of Teheran. In 1970 he should have retired from the chair in Kansas City due to his age, but he went on lecturing on a privately financed chair (Henry Haskell Chair of Sociology) for another 21 years until 1991.

In 1928 Manheim married Anna Sophie Witters (1900–1988) from Osnabrück. They had one son Frank Tibor Manheim (*1930). In 1991 Manheim married the US-American psychologist Sheelagh Graham Bull (*1943 in Canada).

== Death ==
Ernest Manheim died in Kansas City in 2002 at the age of 102.

== The Scholar ==
The years in Germany can be seen as the period of Manheim as a theorist. Educated in the sciences, in philosophy and in social sciences, he changed, influenced by Hans Freyer, from philosophy to sociology. His doctoral thesis was written under the influence of strong philosophical tradition, it can, however, be already understood as a contribution to the sociology of knowledge. With his habilitation thesis The Makers of Public Opinion, although withdrawn by the author, (see above) he was to become a pioneer of the theory of communication.

It was typical of Manheim and the Leipzig School of Sociology to use historical argumentation.

The London years make up the phase of Manheim the anthropologist. He enhanced his work adding studies in cultural anthropology and approaches to social psychology The years in Chicago and Kansas City show Ernest Manheim the empirical researcher. He studied and wrote about the interrelation between urban life style and psychological disease, about juvenile problems, crime prevention, minorities and prejudices.

In practice Manheim was instrumental in improving the conditions for Afro-American students at the University of Kansas City.

== The Composer ==
Manheim was also a composer. In Budapest and Vienna he attended conservatories besides his scientific studies. About 1922 he composed his Quintet for flute, viola, cello and lute. In Leipzig he created choir and song compositions, also for texts by Martin Luther, in London for texts of Irish and English poets. His work as a composer reached its peak in Kansas City, the most important works being the Introductory Music to the Chinese drama Der Kreidekreis. He composed a symphony, chorus music, madrigals, chamber music, and pieces for his grandchildren. The Volker String Quartet and the Kansas City Symphony, among others, have performed his compositions.

== Honours ==
- 1973: Thomas Jefferson Award of the University of Missouri
- 1997: Austrian Cross of Honour for Science and Art, 1st class
- 1998: Dedication of the "Ernest Mannheim Hall" at the University of Kansas City, Missouri
- 2002: Award of honorary doctorate of the University of Leipzig on his 100th birthday

== Works (selection) ==
- Zur Logik des konkreten Begriffs. München: C.H. Beck’sche Verlagshandlung 1930, XI, 156 S.
- Die Träger der Öffentliche Meinung. Studien zur Soziologie der Öffentlichkeit, Verlag Rudolf M. Rohrer, Brünn/Prag/Leipzig/Wien 1933.
- Aufklärung und öffentliche Meinung. Studien zur Soziologie der Öffentlichkeit im 18. Jahrhundert. Herausgegeben und eingeleitet von Norbert Schindler, frommann-holzboog, Stuttgart/Bad Cannstatt 1979 (= Kultur und Gesellschaft, neue historische Forschungen. 4.), new edition
- Beiträge zu einer Geschichte der autoritären Familie, in: "Studien über Autorität und Familie. Forschungsberichte aus dem Institut für Sozialforschung", zu Klampen, Lüneburg 1987 (= Institut für Sozialforschung. Schriften. 5.), pp. 523–574
- Youth in trouble. City of Kansas City, Missouri. Released by The Community Service Division, Department of Welfare. Kansas City, Missouri, 1945
