= Oliver Lepsius =

German professor of jurisprudence

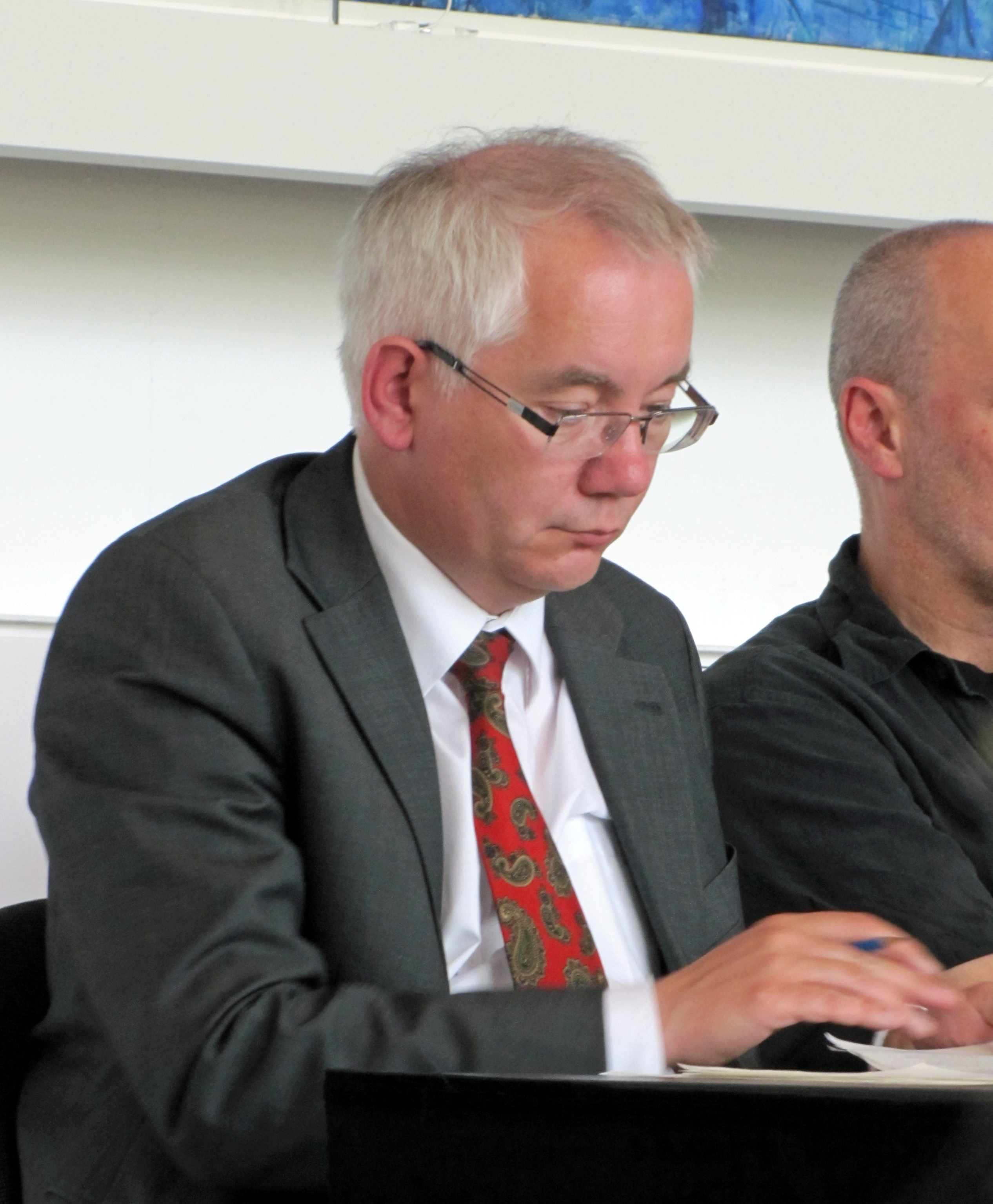
- Oliver Lepsius (2011)
- Born: February 2, 1964 (age 62)

Oliver Lepsius (born 2 February 1964) is a German professor of jurisprudence at the University of Münster.

His public profile was raised in 2011 by the scandal involving Germany's Defence Minister, Karl-Theodor zu Guttenberg. It was determined that the youthful minister's doctoral dissertation, awarded in 2007, had been over-dependent on plagiarism. The university revoked the doctorate and the minister resigned. In public interviews Oliver Lepsius, the university's professor of jurisprudence expressed his anger very powerfully over the affair.

== Life ==
Oliver Nicolai Lepsius was born in Munich. By the time he completed his school leaving exams (Abitur) he was attending school at Weinheim (near Heidelberg). He then undertook his military service. Moving on, he studied Jurisprudence at Bonn, later switching to LMU Munich which is where he passed the appropriate state professional exams (Staatsexamen) at both levels. It was also at LMU Munich that he received his doctorate in 1993. By this time his education had also included a year at the University of Chicago, from where he was awarded a Master of Laws (LL/B.) degree. It was also from LMU Munich that he received his habilitation (higher academic qualification) for work on property rights in public law.

Habilitation cleared the way for an academic career, and in 2001, he took a position as professor for Public Law at Heidelberg University. In 2002, he accepted a teaching chair in Public and Comparative Law at University of Bayreuth in succession to Peter Häberle. It was Häberle who had supervised Guttenberg for the latter's 2007 dissertation, but without at that stage spotting the issues that gave rise to the subsequent revocation of the resulting doctorate.

Lepsius' academic work is focused on contemporary German administrative and constitutional law and its historical underpinnings. He is also concerned with the philosophy and comparative study of public law.

== Personal ==
Oliver Lepsius is married to Susanne Lepsius (née Degenring), a professor of international jurisprudence at LMU Munich. His father was the sociology professor Mario Rainer Lepsius (1920–2014). His mother, Renate Lepsius née Meyer (1927–2004), was a journalist, historian and politician.
