= Leopold von Wiese =

German sociologist and economist (1876-1989)

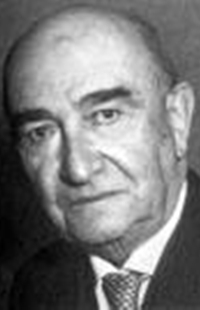
Leopold Wiese

Leopold Max Walther von Wiese und Kaiserswaldau (2 December 1876, Glatz, German Empire – 11 January 1969, Cologne, West Germany) was a German sociologist and economist, as well as professor and chairman of the German Sociological Association.

== Biography ==
Leopold von Wiese was the only son of a Prussian officer and received his education at cadet schools in Wahlstatt and Lichterfelde. After leaving the cadet corps, he studied economics at the Friedrich Wilhelm University in Berlin where he got his Ph.D. in 1902. Subsequently, he was scientific secretary of the "Institute for the common good" (Institut für Gemeinwohl) in Frankfurt. In 1905, he was Associate Professor of Economics at the University of Berlin. In 1906, he was appointed professor of political science at the Royal Academy in Posen; in 1908, he joined the Technical University of Hannover as a professor of economics and business management. In 1912, he became director of studies at the Academy for Local Government (Akademie für kommunale Verwaltung) in Düsseldorf, and in 1915 a professor at the Graduate School of Cologne (Handelshochschule Köln).

After the First World War, in 1919, Wiese was appointed as Director at the Research Institute for Social Sciences (Forschungsinstitut für Sozialwissenschaften) in Cologne and as Professor of Economic and Political Sciences, meaning sociology, at the University of Cologne (refounded in 1919). He thus held the first chair of sociology in Germany. He was also director of "Institute for Social Research" which was founded on the initiative of the Mayor Adenauer. In 1921, he co-founded the academic journal Kölner Zeitschrift für Soziologie und Sozialpsychologie.

Until 1933, Wiese was secretary of the German Society for Sociology (DGS). After the forced closure of the DGS by Hans Freyer and the Research Institute for Social Sciences by the Nazis in 1934 Wiese went for a year to the United States. His successor was Willy Gierlichs. Upon his return, Wiese taught economics to a closed circle of listeners.

In 1946 he became chairman of the revived DGS, which he reformed until 1955 as its chairman. In 1954 he became vice-president of the International Sociological Association.

== Legacy ==
Wiese is known for his works on social studies. He tried to establish the presence of sociology as an independent social science, divorced from history, psychology and philosophy. Leopold von Wiese focused on the social relations between people as "social processes" and the significance of structures as "social constructs." Together with Georg Simmel, he is considered the founder of formal sociology. His relationship doctrine Beziehungslehre lost its effect today at universities.

Among his pupils was Karl Gustav Specht, co-founder of gerontology and medical sociology in Germany and Professor of Sociology at the Economic and Social Science Faculty of the University of Erlangen–Nuremberg.

Wiese is the father of the literary scholar Benno von Wiese and the actress and writer Ursula von Wiese. Wiese's grandchildren include the British politician, Irina von Wiese.

== See also ==
- Ethik in der Schauweise der Wissenschaften vom Menschen und von der Gesellschaft
