= Paula-Irene Villa Braslavsky =

German-Argentine sociologist

Paula-Irene Villa Braslavsky (born 1968) is a German-Argentine sociologist. She is a professor of general sociology and gender studies at LMU Munich and president of the German Sociological Association.

== Career ==
Villa Braslavsky was born in Santiago de Chile and grew up in Argentina, Chile, USA, Canada, and Germany. She is a daughter of the chemist Silvia Braslavsky and a grandchild of the educator Berta Perelstein de Braslavsky. She moved to Germany with her mother and sister in 1976. She studied social sciences in Bochum and Buenos Aires. She worked at the University of Hanover before she became professor of general sociology and gender studies at LMU, where she was director of the Department of Sociology from 2010 to 2012.

In 2021, she became president of the German Sociological Association. She has served on its board since 2013. She is also a board member of the Gender Studies Association in Germany.
