= Ethik in der Schauweise der Wissenschaften vom Menschen und von der Gesellschaft =

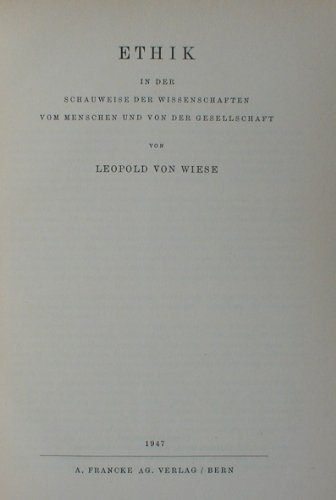
Book cover of Ethik in der Schauweise der Wissenschaften vom Menschen und von der Gesellschaft by Leopold von Wiese

Ethik in der Schauweise der Wissenschaften vom Menschen und von der Gesellschaft is a book by German sociologist and economist Leopold von Wiese which has first been published in 1947 at A. Francke AG. It contains a typology of ethics, opposing individual to social ethics. The book rounded up a bunch of Leopold von Wiese's writings "which are intrinsically linked", including Gedanken über Menschlichkeit (1915), Homo sum: Gedanken zu einer zusammenfassenden Anthropologie (1940), and, finally, die Ethik in der Schauweise der Wissenschaften vom Menschen und von der Gesellschaft.

Leopold von Wiese's Ethik is divided into a "general" and a "specific part": The first part consists of eight chapters: 1) the word "ethics", 2) a "methodological foundation", 3) a "history of ideas, the foundation", and 4) a "systematic foundation", 5) a "distinct from related display modes", 6)" Principles of individual ethics with a pathetic discourse on ethics and unemotional ", 7)" Broad social ethics, and 8) "imperatives".
