= Renate Lepsius =

German politician (1927–2004)

- Born: Renate Meyer; 21 June 1927; Berlin, Germany
- Died: 28 June 2004 (aged 77); Weinheim, Germany, Baden-Württemberg, Germany
- Education: Humboldt University of Berlin
- Occupations: historian politician
- Political party: SPD
- Spouse: M. Rainer Lepsius (1928-2014)
- Children: Oliver Lepsius

Renate Lepsius (born Renate Meyer: 21 June 1927 - 28 June 2004) was a German journalist, historian and politician (SPD). She resigned from the German parliament ("Bundestag") ahead of the 1987 election, by which time she had spent almost fifteen years as a high-profile member of it. That same year saw the publication of, "Frauenpolitik als Beruf. Gespräche mit SPD Parlementarierrinnen" (loosely: "Politics as a profession for women. Conversations with SPD women politicians"), which the respected commentator Rolf Zundel, writing in 1987, described as "probably the most impressive book about women in politics for many years".

== Life ==
=== Family provenance and early years ===
Renate Meyer, a twin, was born during the early summer of 1927 in Berlin during the closing years of the Weimar period. She had a brother who had been born four years earlier. Her sister, whom she later liked to insist was "half an hour older", was the other twin. She came from a family of middle class intellectuals. Her father, originally from Germany's northwestern coastal flatlands, was head of a local senior school, a member of the centre-left Democratic Party and a passionate advocate of land reform. Her mother had also planned to join the teaching profession, but had been diverted into domesticity during the economically and politically troubled postwar years. Until 1933 the family lived comfortably. Their social circle was large and contained many people who would have considered themselves intellectuals and / or Jewish.

=== Nazi years ===
During the early months of 1933, the new Hitler regime lost little time in transforming the country into a one-party dictatorship. Unlike most members of the intellectual liberal elite, Renate's father had read Mein Kampf, the chancellor's bizarre presentation of his political views, shortly after its publication back in 1925, and was evidently less surprised than many by what happened after 1933. He was quickly transferred to a less important job, and in many respects the family spent the twelve Nazi years as "internal emigrants", separating themselves from the social and political mainstream while avoiding the more suicidal aspects of "active resistance". Invoking what one source describes as "tricks and excuses", Renate's mother managed to keep her girls out of the government backed Bund Deutscher Mädel (literally "League of German Girls"). The Meyers did retain clandestine (and dangerous) contacts with those Jewish friends who had not fled abroad or been disappeared. Meyer was aware of one Jewish friend whom, with others in their circle, her parents were able to save from deportation to the death camps, rotating her secretly between a succession of hiding places. The constant danger of denunciation to the authorities, the need to know as though by instinct when to avoid sharing information or opinions and the feeling of being excluded from the majority of the pro-Nazi "right thinking" mainstream, were a constant backdrop of Renate Meyer's childhood. That, along with the awareness that her family had been part of a small number of well-informed politically aware individuals who had recognised the inhumanity underlying Nazi policy from the outset, provided a moral and intellectual context for the rest of Renate Meyer's life.

=== Education ===
Renate Meyer attended junior school locally in the Schlachtensee district on the south side of Berlin, and then moved to a senior school in the nearby Dahlem quarter. Looking back on her school days, she would recall that she seemed "always to be the youngest in the class". In 1943, the Berlin schools were evacuated because of the bombing and she ended up attending school in Potsdam. In 1944, she was conscripted for war work at the Telefunken factory. In 1945, she nevertheless succeeded in passing her "Notabitur" - a version of the usual school leaving exam, truncated because of the impact of war Under normal conditions that would have opened the way to university-level education, and in the winter term of 1947, she enrolled at the Humboldt University of Berlin. She had to struggle for a place not merely against her father's opposition but also on account of the need to compete with surviving (male) soldiers returning from the front and keen to catch up on their education. In the end she secured her place thanks to the intervention of her father's communist boss. (The Humboldt, in the eastern part of the city centre, had ended up in the Soviet occupation zone. She studied History, Literature and Social-Political Sciences.

Her father's objection to her attending university was reportedly based both on the expense involved and on a belief that women should concentrate on their "domestic responsibilities" and in this he was reportedly backed by his wife, despite the frustration of her own earlier plans to become a teacher. After a year Renate Meyer switched to the University of Freiburg, about as far from Berlin as it was possible to relocate to without emigrating, "in order to free myself from the strong arm of my father". Later in 1948 she went to England at the invitation of the London-based German Educational Reconstruction Committee (GER), an organisation with close links to the ruling Labour Party. The GER had been founded by German emigrants during the war. She was impressed by the full shops and by the friendliness of the people she met in England. It was at the London School of Economics that in 1951 she met Rainer Lepsius whom she would later marry. In London she also met, and was influenced by, a number of ruling Labour Party including, notably, several Quakers. She was intrigued by movement's refreshing internationalism and pacifism. There was also a more personal aspect to her stay in England which enabled her to make progress with the difficult task of escaping from her father's evidently formidable intellectual influence. By 1953, she was back in Berlin, which is where she received her doctorate in history that year. Her doctoral dissertation dealt with "a foreign policy" topic.

=== Political and career development ===
War ended in military defeat and an end to the Nazi regime in May 1945. Renate's father was a founder member of the new centre-right Christian Democratic Union (CDU), a new political party intended to combine the various strands of political moderation which it was believed had, through their fragmentation, opened up a path for populism in the buildup to 1933. Filled with enthusiasm for the cause, Mr Meyer enrolled his entire family into the new party. This triggered a major political conflict with his younger daughter. The elder twin and her mother contentedly accepted party membership while Renate did not. Differences resurfaced in 1956 when, aged 29, she joined the left wing Social Democratic Party (SPD). "In his eyes I had become a communist" she later observed, recalling her father's reaction.

After receiving her doctorate in 1953, Renate Meyer had been ambitious to embark on a political career, but she found that there was no demand in the job-market for women keen to work in politics on the basis of a higher degree in history. Despite the rapid economic growth of the 1950s in West Germany and the slaughter of war half a generation earlier, unemployment was still relatively high because of the scale of the ethnic cleansing of the 1940s from the eastern third of Germany. These territories had been transferred, formally in 1945, to Poland, Czechoslovakia and the Soviet Union. Further competition for jobs came from the millions more who crossed from East Germany to West Germany during the 1950s in search of a better life. In the end Renate Meyer took a job as a typist in Bonn with the German Academic Exchange Service ("Deutscher Akademischer Austauschdienst" / DAAD). It might not have been the path to a stellar career for which she had planned, but since Bonn had been selected, in 1949, as the "provisional capital" of West Germany, the work placed her close to the world of politics in which she aspired to participate. Meyer would later express herself forcefully on the subject of the gender discrimination she experienced as a typist in Bonn. Gender discrimination was a theme to which she would return many times after her political career eventually took off. Following a couple of years as a secretary-typist she resigned in order to accept a very much better paid job with the press office of the Inter Nationes organisation, securing rapid promotion. In 1955 she even joined a trades union, a source of continuing pride ("worauf ich doch recht stolz bin"), as she later told an interviewer. 1956 was the year in which she defied her father's world view further by becoming a member of the Social Democratic Party (SPD). Around this time she also started working for the party on a voluntary (unpaid) basis.

=== Rainer Lepsius ===
In 1958, Renate Meyer married the sociologist Rainer Lepsius. Their son, Oliver Lepsius, was born in 1964. Rainer Lepsius was by now based at LMU Munich, working on his habilitation. Renate therefore gave up her job in Bonn and moved to Munich to live with her new husband. She now undertook journalistic assignments, working from home.

In Munich, Renate Lepsius remained involved with the party. However, the long-awaited birth of her child, and her decision to take personal charge of his education during his earlier years enforced a further postponement of her own political career. Shortly after their son's first birthday, having passed his habilitation exam, accepted a post at what is now the University of Mannheim and the couple moved to nearby Weinheim, which is where the couple lived for the rest of their lives.

=== Regional politics ===
Almost as soon as the couple moved to Weinheim, Renate Lepsius was appointed a delegate for the local party branch to the national party conference. Later in 1965, she became a member of the regional "state" party executive for Baden-Württemberg. Within it, she served on two working groups, in respect of "Young people and policy" ("Jugend und Politik") and "Women's policies" ("Frauenpolitik"). She found the level of work compatible with her domestic duties.

In 1968, however, her political commitment increased, as she engaged whole-heartedly in campaigning for that year's elections to the Baden-Württemberg regional / state parliament (Landtag), organising with a colleague the party's entire advertising campaign for the election, which included a programme of advertising targeted expressly at women voters. It was also in 1968 that she became a member of the SPD "party council" ("Parteirat"). After the election was over, in 1969 she also joined the advisory council ("wissenschaftliche Beirat") of the Bonn-based National Agency for Political Education ("Bundeszentrale für politische Bildung" / bpb).

=== National politics ===
In 1972, she seized the opportunity to compete for a seat in the German parliament ("Bundestag"), in the election that in retrospect came to be known among supporters as the "Willy-Wahl", because it was won by the SPD under the national leadership of Willy Brandt. Principal themes of her campaign included national policy in respect of East Germany ("Ostpolitik"), economic stability, involvement of citizens in planning decisions (encompassed the so-called "Städtebauförderungsgesetz" if 1971) and, powerfully anticipating her subsequent campaigns, social provisions for vulnerable women, notably following divorce or bereavement. She also spoke out strongly in favour of abortion law reform (§218), an issue that was rising rapidly up the political agenda across western Europe in the wider context of Second-wave feminism. She failed to win the seat in her own Rastatt constituency where (as in every election between 1949 and 2017) the seat went to a candidate from the centre-right CDU candidate. However, her name was at position ten on the high enough up on the SPD candidate list for Baden-Württemberg, which was sufficient to win her a seat when seats allocated according to overall party vote-share were allocated.

Bundestag colleagues sometimes found Renate Lepsius a little unpredictable and headstrong. After 1973 she was no longer a member of the party executive for Baden-Württemberg. 1973 also saw her removed from the SPD "party council" ("Parteirat"). Her energy nevertheless made her hard to ignore. Much of the focus of her attention continued to be on "women's issues": she came to be particularly strongly identified with pressure for divorce law reform. In 1981, Lepsius was keen to succeed Marie Schlei as deputy chair of the SPD party group in the Bundestag. She enjoyed the support of the parliamentary group leader, Herbert Wehner. She nevertheless failed to gain support from colleagues in the parliament, which represented a significant and lasting setback to her political career.
