= Gotthard Günther =

German philosopher

Gotthard Günther (15 June 1900 – 29 November 1984) was a German (Prussian) philosopher.

== Biography ==
Günther was born in Arnsdorf, Hirschberg im Riesengebirge, Prussian Silesia (modern day Karkonosze, Poland). From 1921 to 1933, Günther studied sinology and philosophy at the universities of Heidelberg and Berlin, and wrote his doctor's thesis on Hegel in 1933 under the guidance of Eduard Spranger. From 1935 to 1937, he worked at the institute of Arnold Gehlen at the University of Leipzig, publishing Christliche Metaphysik und das Schicksal des modernen Bewusstseins (Christian metaphysics and the fate of modern consciousness, together with Helmut Schelsky in 1937). He was a member of the Leipzig School.

In the same year, following his wife, the Jewish psychologist Dr. Marie Günther-Hendel, he emigrated from Germany first to Italy, afterwards to Stellenbosch University in South Africa and, in 1940, to the United States. There he completed his system of place-valued logics and morphogrammatics. His great study Die philosophische Idee einer nicht-Aristotelischen Logik (“The philosophical concept of a non-Aristotelian logic”) went to print in 1957 (Hamburg, Meiner). As a research professor, he joined the department of electrical engineering at the University of Illinois at Urbana-Champaign in 1960, working together with Warren Sturgis McCulloch, Heinz von Foerster, Humberto Maturana and others. In 1962, he published Cybernetic ontology and transjunctional operations. Later he lectured at the University of Hamburg until he died in that city, in 1984 at the age of 84.

According to Isaac Asimov, who considered Gunther "a good friend," Gunther "felt that civilization was a product of the Old World and could not flourish indigenously in the New." Asimov noted that Gunther thus "maintained [that] when Old World civilization was transplanted to the New World, a distortion was introduced and one of the ways in which this distortion was evidenced was by the peculiar American invention of science fiction, which was not to be confused with earlier European ventures in the field (i.e., Jules Vernes)."

== Work and legacy ==
Günther's work was based upon Georg Wilhelm Friedrich Hegel, Martin Heidegger and Oswald Spengler. He developed a trans-Aristotelian logical approach (omitting the tertium non datur). Günther's transclassical logic was the attempt to combine improved results of modern dialectic with formal logic. His focus on the philosophical problem of the "Du" ("You"/"Thou") was trailblazing. He also contributed to the fields of cybernetics and to both natural and social sciences, especially to sociology.

His œuvre (body of work), in German and English, is quite substantial. An overview can be gathered from his three volumes, helping make dialectics operationable (see below). He was of influence in the areas of philosophy, cybernetics, mathematics, and sociology. As of 2004, the Gotthard Günther Research Center (“Gotthard-Günther-Forschungsstelle”) is working at the University of Klagenfurt in Austria.

== Publications ==
- 1933, Grundzüge einer neuen Theorie des Denkens in Hegels Logik [Fundamentals of a Theory of Thinking in Hegel's Logic]. Second, expanded edition, with a new foreword. Hamburg: Meiner, 1978. ISBN 3-7873-0435-5.
- 1937, Christliche Metaphysik und das Schicksal des modernen Bewusstseins. Leipzig: Hirzel.
- 1952, Uberwindung von Raum und Zeit: phantastische Geschichten aus der Welt von Morgen. Düsseldorf: Karl Rauch.
- 1957, Das Bewusstsein der Maschinen: eine Metaphysik der Kybernetik. Krefeld, Baden-Baden: Agis-Verlag. Second, expanded edition 1963. Third edition as Das Bewusstsein der Maschinen: eine Metaphysik der Kybernetik, mit einem Beitrag aus dem Nachlass: "Erkennen und Wollen", edited by Eberhard von Goldammer and Joachim Paul. Baden-Baden: Agis-Verlag, 2002. ISBN 3-87007-009-9. French edition, as La conscience des machines: une métaphysique de la cybernétique; suivi de Cognition et volition, third edition, edited by Eberhard von Goldammer and Joachim Paul, translated by Françoise Parrot and Engelbert Kronthaler, Paris: l'Harmattan, 2008.
- 1959, Idee und Grundriss einer nicht-Aristotelischen Logik, Bd. 1. Die Idee und ihre philosophischen Voraussetzungen. [Idea and Outline of a Non-Aristotelian Logic, vol. 1: The Idea and Its Philosophical Postulates]. Hamburg: F. Meiner. Second, revised edition, Hamburg: F. Meiner, 1978. Third edition, as Idee und Grundriss einer nicht-Aristotelischen Logik: die Idee und ihre philosophischen Voraussetzungen: mit einem Anhang Das Phänomen der Orthogonalität, und mit einem Fragment aus dem Nachlass Die Metamorphose der Zahl. Hamburg: Meiner, 1991. ISBN 3-7873-1033-9.
- 1962, Cybernetic Ontology and Transjunctional Operations. University of Illinois, Engineering Experiment Station. Technical Report no. 4. Urbana: Electrical Engineering Research Laboratory, University of Illinois.
- 1965, Cybernetics and the Transition from Classical to Trans-Classical Logic. Illinois University Biological Computer Laboratory BCL Report 3.0. Urbana: Biological Computer Laboratory, University of Illinois.
- 1967, Logik, Zeit, Emanation und Evolution. Arbeitsgemeinschaft für Forschung des Landes Nordrhein-Westfalen. Geistwissenschaften 136. Cologne-Opladen: Westdeutscher Verlag.
- 1973, Notable work: H. Fahrenbach (Hrsg). "Wirklichkeit und Reflexion, Festschrift fur Walter Schulz", Pfullingen, 1973 (187 - 210). Also published as: Beiträge zur Grundlegung einer operationsfähigen Dialektik. Semantic Scholar.
- 1976, Beiträge zur Grundlegung einer operationsfähigen Dialektik, 1 (Contributions to the Foundation of an Operational Dialectic, 1). Hamburg: Meiner. ISBN 3-7873-0371-5.
- 1979, Beiträge zur Grundlegung einer operationsfähigen Dialektik, 2, (Contributions to the Foundation of an Operational Dialectic, 2)
- 1980, Beiträge zur Grundlegung einer operationsfähigen Dialektik, 3, (Contributions to the Foundation of an Operational Dialectic, 3)
- 1973, Notable work: H. Fahrenbach (Hrsg). "Wirklichkeit und Reflexion, Festschrift fur Walter Schulz", Pfullingen, 1973. Also published as: Beiträge zur Grundlegung einer operationsfähigen Dialektik
