= Sociology of space =

Sub-discipline of sociology

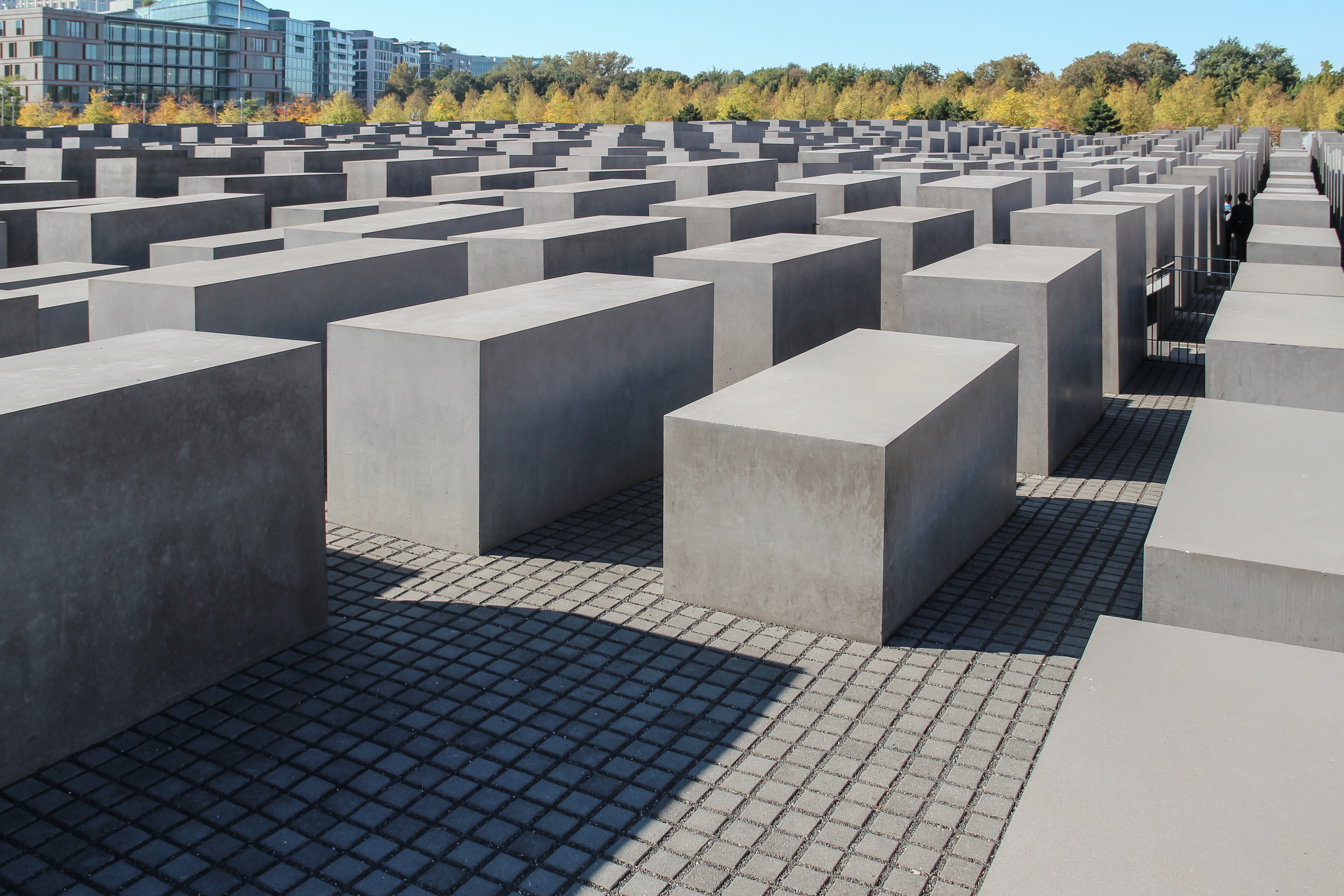
Memorial to the Murdered Jews of Europe, Berlin, Germany. The use of space emphasises the depth of loss from the holocaust genocide.

The sociology of space is a sub-discipline of sociology that mostly borrows from theories developed within the discipline of geography, including the sub fields of human geography, economic geography, and feminist geography. The "sociology" of space examines the social and material constitution of spaces. It is concerned with understanding the social practices, institutional forces, and material complexity of how humans and spaces interact. The sociology of space is an inter-disciplinary area of study, drawing on various theoretical traditions including Marxism, postcolonialism, and Science and Technology Studies, and overlaps and encompasses theorists with various academic disciplines such as geography and architecture. Edward T. Hall developed the study of Proxemics which concentrates on the empirical analysis of space in psychology.

== Definition of space ==
Space is one of the most important concepts within the disciplines of social science as it is fundamental to our understanding of geography. The term "space" has been defined variously by scholars:

In general terms, the Oxford English Dictionary defines space in two ways:

1. A continuous extension viewed with or without reference to the existence of objects within it.
2. The interval between points or objects viewed as having one, two or three dimensions.

However, the human geographers' interest is in the objects within the space and their relative position, which involves the description, explanation and prediction of the distribution of phenomena. Thus, the relationships between objects in space is the central of the study.

Michel Foucault defines space as; "The space in which we live, which draws us out of ourselves, in which the erosion of our lives, our time and our history occurs, the space that claws and gnaws at us, is also, in itself, a heterogeneous space…..we live inside a set of relations."

Nigel Thrift also defines space as; "The outcome of a series of highly problematic temporary settlements that divide and connect things up into different kinds of collectives which are slowly provided with the meaning which render them durable and sustainable."

In short, "space" is the social space in which we live and create relationships with other people, societies and surroundings. Space is an outcome of the hard and continuous work of building up and maintaining collectives by bringing different things into alignments. All kinds of different spaces can and therefore do exist which may or may not relate to each other. Thus, through space, we can understand more about social action.

== History of the sociology of space ==
Georg Simmel has been seen as the classical sociologist who was most important to this field. Simmel wrote on "the sociology of space" in his 1908 book "Sociology: Investigations on the Forms of Sociation". His concerns included the process of metropolitanisation and the separation of leisure spaces in modern economic societies.

The category of space long played a subordinate role in sociological theory formation. Only in the late 1980s did it come to be realised that certain changes in society cannot be adequately explained without taking greater account of the spatial components of life. This shift in perspective is referred to as the spatial turn. The space concept directs attention to organisational forms of juxtaposition. The focus is on differences between places and their mutual influence. This applies equally for the micro-spaces of everyday life and the macro-spaces at the nation-state or global levels.

The theoretical basis for the growing interest of the social sciences in space was set primarily by English and French-speaking sociologists, philosophers, and human geographers. Of particular importance is Michel Foucault’s essay on "Of Other Spaces", in which the author proclaims the "age of space", and Henri Lefebvre's seminal work "La production de l'espace". The latter provided the grounding for Marxist spatial theory on which David Harvey, Manuel Castells, Edward Soja, and others have built. Marxist theories of space, which are predicated on a structural, i.e., capitalist or global determinants of spaces and the growing homogenization of space, are confronted by action theoretical conceptions, which stress the importance of the corporeal placing and the perception of spaces as albeit habitually predetermined but subjective constructions. One example is the theory of space of the German sociologist Martina Löw. Approaches deriving from the post-colonialism discourse have attracted greater attention in recent years. Also in contrast to Marxist concepts of space, British geographer Doreen Massey and German sociologist Helmuth Berking, for instance, emphasise the heterogeneity of local contexts and the place-relatedness of our knowledge about the world.

== Duality of space ==
Martina Löw developed the idea of a "relational" model of space, which focuses on the "orderings" of living entities and social goods, and examines how space is constituted in processes of perception, recall, or ideation to manifest itself as societal structure. From a social theory point of view, it follows on from the theory of structuration proposed by Anthony Giddens, whose concept of the "duality of structure" Löw extends sociological terms into a "duality of space". The basic idea is that individuals act as social agents (and constitute spaces in the process), but that their action depends on economic, legal, social, cultural, and, finally, spatial structures. Spaces are hence the outcome of action. At the same time, spaces structure action, that is to say spaces can both constrain and enable action.

With respect to the constitution of space, Löw distinguishes analytically between two, generally mutually determining factors: "spacing" and "synthesis". Spacing refers to the act of placing or the state of being placed of social goods and people in places. According to Löw, however, an ordering created through placings is only effectively constituted as space where the elements that compose it are actively interlinked by people – in processes of perception, ideation, or recall. Löw calls this synthesis. This concept has been empirically tested in studies such as those by Lars Meier (who examined the constitution of space in the everyday life of financial managers in London and Singapore), Cedric Janowicz (who carried out an ethnographical-space sociological study of food supply in the Ghanaian city of Accra), and Silke Streets (who looked at processes of space constitution in the creative industries in Leipzig).

== Marxist approaches ==
=== The social production of space ===
The most important proponent of Marxist spatial theory was Henri Lefebvre. He proposed "social space" to be where the relations of production are reproduced and that dialectical contradictions were spatial rather than temporal. Lefebvre sees the societal production of space as a dialectical interaction between three factors, which exist in a kind of trialectics:

- Spatial practice (perceived space): i.e., perceived physical space; space as reproduced in everyday life. "It embodies a close association, within perceived space, between daily reality (daily routine) and urban reality (the routes and networks which link up the places set aside for work, 'private' life and leisure)."
- Representation of space (conceived space): i.e., conceptualized representations of space; space as developed cognitively. "[C]onceptualized space, the space of scientists, planners ... [t]his is the dominant space in any society (or mode of production)."
- Representational spaces (lived space): i.e., symbolisations and ideational spaces. "[S]pace as directly lived through its associated images and symbols."

Lefebvre's statement that "(social) space is a (social) product" was influenced by Marx's commodity fetishism. His theory on social space was influenced by the Bauhaus art movement.

In Lefebvre's view of the 1970s, this spatial production resulted in a space of non-reflexive everydayness marked by alienation, dominating through mathematical-abstract concepts of space, and reproduced in spatial practice. Lefebvre sees a line of flight from alienated spatiality in the spaces of representation – in notions of non-alienated, mythical, pre-modern, or artistic visions of space.

=== Time-space compression ===
The Marxist spatial theory was given decisive new impetus by David Harvey, in particular, who was interested in the effects of the transition from Fordism to "flexible accumulation" on the experience of space and time. He shows how various innovations at the economic and technological levels have breached the crisis-prone inflexibility of the Fordist system, thus increasing the turnover rate of capital. This causes a general acceleration of economic cycles. According to Harvey, the result is "time–space compression". While the feeling for the long term, for the future, for continuity is lost, the relationship between proximity and distance becomes more and more difficult to determine.

=== Thirdspace ===
Lefebvre's spatial triad was then appropriated by different scholars, including Edward Soja and David Harvey, who carried on this new tradition in human geography. Among them, the most well-known appropriated version of the spatial triad is Thirdspace formulated by Soja. His theory categorizes urban space into three types:

- Firstspace: the physical built environment, which can be mapped, quantifiably measured and 'seen' in the real world.
- Secondspace: conceptual space conceived in the minds of the people who inhabit it.
- Thirdspace: 'real and imagined' space, lived space, the way that people actually live in and experience that urban space.

Soja argues that our old ways to thinking about space (first and second space theories) can no longer accommodate the way the world works because he believed that spaces may not be contained within one social category, they may include different aspects of many categories or developed within the boundaries of a number of categories (e.g., two different cultures combine and emerge as a third culture; this third hybrid space displaces the original values that constitute it and set up new values and perspectives that is different from the first two spaces; thus, the third space theory can explain some of the complexity of poverty, social exclusion and social inclusion, gender and race issues.).

=== Mind–body problem ===
Lefebvre introduced the concept of triadic representational spaces as a synthesis of mind–body dualism, as opposed to monism or phenomenology. Under a Lefebvrian "unity theory", the mind–body problem is brought together through the triad of social space, mental space, and physical space.

Influenced by Paul Ricœur, J. N. Entrikin attempts to solve the mind–body problem of social space by presupposing Cartesian dualism to argue that narrative can be an intermediary between mind and extension.

== Postcolonial theories of space ==
Theories of space that are inspired by the post-colonialism discourse focus on the heterogeneity of spaces. According to Doreen Massey, calling a country in Africa a "developing country" is not appropriate, since this expression implies that spatial difference is temporal difference (Massey 1999b). This logic treats such a country not as different but merely as an early version of countries in the "developed" world, a view she condemns as "Eurocentrism". In this vein, Helmuth Berking criticises theories that postulate the increasing homogenisation of the world through globalisation as "globocentrism". He confronts this with the distinctiveness and importance of local knowledge resources for the production of (different and specific) places. He claims that local contexts form a sort of framework or filter through which global processes and globally circulating images and symbols are appropriated, thus attaining meaning. For instance, the film character Conan the Barbarian is a different figure in radical rightwing circles in Germany than in the black ghettoes of the Chicago Southside, just as McDonald's means something different in Moscow than in Paris.

== Relational view of space ==
In the work of geographer and critical theorist Nigel Thrift, he wrote a relational view of space in which, rather than seeing space being viewed as a container within which the world proceeds, space should be seen as a co-product of these proceedings. He explained about four constructed space in modern human geography. There are four different kinds of space according to how modern geography thinks about space. They are 1. Empirical Construction of Space, 2. Unblocking space, 3. Image space and 4. Place Space.

First Space is the empirical construction of space. Empirical space refers to the process whereby the mundane fabric of daily life is constructed. These simple things like, cars, houses, mobiles, computers, and roads are very simple but they are great achievements of our daily life and they play very important role in making up who we are today. For example, today's technology such as GPS did not suddenly come into existence; in fact, it is laid down in the 18th century and developed throughout time. The first space is real and tangible, and it is also known as physical space. Second space is the unblocking space. This type of space refers to the process whereby routine pathways of interaction as set up around which boundaries are often drawn. The routine may include the movement of office workers, the interaction of drunk teenagers, and the flow of goods, money, people, and information. Unlike the old time in geography when people accepted a space as blocked boundary (Example: A capitalist space, neoliberal space or city space), we began to realize that there is no such thing like boundaries in space. The space of the world is flowing and transforming continuously that it is very difficult to describe in a fixed way. The second space is ideology/conceptual and it is also known as mental space. For example, the second space will explain the behaviors of people from different social class and the social segregation among rich and poor people. Third space is the image space that refers to the process whereby the images has produced new kind of space. The images may be in different form and shape; ranging from painting to photograph, from portrait to post card, and from religious theme to entertainment. Nowadays, we are highly influenced by images in many ways and these certain images can tell us new social and cultures values, or something new about how we see the world. Images, symbols and sign do have some kind of spatial expression. Fourth space is the place that refers to the process whereby spaces are ordered in ways that open up affective and other embodied potentials. Place space has more meaning than a place, and it can represent as different type of space. This fourth type of space tries to understand that place is a vital actor in bringing up people's lives in certain ways and place will let us to understand all kind of things which are hidden form us..

== Scale: the local and the global ==
Andrew Herod mentioned that scale, within human geography, is typically seen in one of the two ways: either as a real material thing which actually exists and is the result of political struggle and/or social process, or as a way of framing our understanding of the world. People's lives across the globe have been re-scaling by contemporary economic, political, cultural and social processes, such as globalization, in complex ways. As a result, we have seen the creation of supranational political bodies such as the European Union, the devolution of political power from the nation-state to regional political bodies. We have also experienced the increasing homogenization and 'Americanization' through the process of globalization while the locals' tendencies (or counter force) among people who defend traditional ways of life increase around the world. The process of re-scaling people's lives and the relationship between the two extremes of our scaled lives- the 'global' and the 'local' were brought into question.

=== Ontological status of the global and the local ===
Until the 1980s, theorizing the concept of 'scale' itself was taken for granted although physical and human geographers looked at issues from 'regional scale' or'national scale'. The questions such as whether scale is simply a mental device categorizing and ordering the world or whether scales really exists as material social products, particularly, were debated among materialists and idealists. Some geographers draw upon Immanuel Kant's idealist philosophy that scales were handy conceptual mechanism for ordering the world while others, by drawing upon Marxist ideas of materialism, argue that scales really exist in the world and they were the real social products. For those idealists based on Kantian's inspiration, the 'global' is defined by the geologically given limits of the earth and the 'local' is defined as a spatial resolution useful for comprehending the process and practices. For materialists, the 'national' scale is a scale that had to be actively created through economic and political processes but not a scale existed in a logical hierarchy between global and the regional.

The notion of 'becoming' and the focus on the politics of producing scales have been central to materialist arguments concerning the global scale. It is important to recognize that social actors may have to work just as hard to become 'local'as they have to work to become 'global'. People paid attention to how transnational corporations have 'gone global', how institutions of governance have 'become' supranational and how labour unions have sought to 'globalize' their operations to match those of an increasingly 'globalized' city.

For the scale 'global' and 'local', Kevin Cox mentioned that moving from the local to the global scale 'is not a movement from one discrete arena to another' but a process of developing networks of associations that allow actors to shift between various spaces of engagement. According to his view, 'scale' is seen as a process rather than as a fixed entity and, in other words, the global and the local are not static 'arenas'within which social life plays out but are constantly made by social actions. For example, a political organization might attempt to go 'global' to engage with actors or opportunities outside of its own space; likewise, a transnational corporation may attempt to 'go local' through tailoring its products and operations in different places.

=== Discourses of the global and the local ===
Gibson-Graham (2002) has identified at least six ways in which the relationship between the local and the global is often viewed.

1. The global and the local are seen as interpretive frames for analyzing situations
2. Drawing on Dirlik, Gibson-Graham suggests that in such a representation, the global is 'something more than the national or regional... anything other than the local'. Meaning that, the global and the local each derive meaning from what they are not.
3. According to French social theorist Bruno Latour, the local and the global 'offer different points of view on networks that are by nature neither local nor global, but are more or less long and more or less connected. Also, in Latour's view, it is impossible to distinguish where the local ends and the global begins.
4. The concept 'The global is local' was proposed by Gibson-Graham. For instance, multinational firms are actually 'multi local' rather than 'global'.
5. The local is global. In this view, the local is an entry point to the world of global flows which encircle the planet.
6. The global and the local are actually the processes rather than the locations. All spaces are the hybrids of global and local; so they are 'glocal.'

There are some western thoughts that greater size and extensiveness imply domination and superior power, such that the local is often represented as 'small and relatively powerless, defined and confined by the global'. So, the global is a force and the local is its field of play. However, the local can serve as a powerful scale of political organization; the global is not a scale just controlled by capital – those who challenge capital can also organize globally( Herod, A). There has been the concept 'Think globally and act locally' viewed by neoliberals.

=== Metaphors of scale ===
For representing how the world is scaled, there are five different and popular metaphors: they are the ladder, concentric circles, Matryoshka nesting dolls, earthworm burrows and tree roots. First, in using such a metaphor of hierarchical ladder, the global as the highest rung on the ladder is seen to be above the local and all other scales. Second, the use of concentric metaphor leaves us with a particular way of conceptualizing the scalar relationship between places. In this second metaphor, the local is seen as a relatively small circle, with the regional as a larger circle encompassing it, while the national and the global scales are still larger circles encompassing the local and the regional. For the hierarchy of Russian Matryoshka nesting dolls, the global can contain other scales but this does not work the other way round; for instance, the local cannot contain the global. For the fourth metaphor concerning with thinking on scale, what French social theorist Bruno Latour argued is that a world of places is 'networked' together. Such the metaphor leaves us with an image of scale in which the global and the local are connected together and not totally separated from each other. For the tree roots metaphor similar with the earthworm burrow metaphor, as the earthworm burrows or tree roots penetrating different strata of the soil, it is difficult to determine exactly where one scale ends and another begins. When thinking about the use of metaphor, it should be aware that the choice of metaphor over another is not made on the basis of which is empirically a 'more accurate'representation of something but, on the basis of how someone is attempting to understand a particular phenomenon.

Such an appreciation of metaphors is important because it suggests that how we talk about scale impacts upon the ways in which we engage socially and politically with our scaled world and that may impact on how we conduct our social, economic and political praxis and so make landscapes ( Herod, A )

== See also ==
- Contact zone
- Sociology of architecture
- Urban sociology
- Latrinalia
- Urban vitality
