= Silvia Braslavsky =

Argentine chemist

Silvia Elsa Braslavsky (born April 5, 1942 in Buenos Aires) is an Argentine chemist. She is the daughter of educationist Berta Perelstein de Braslavsky and biochemist Lázaro Braslavsky, and the sister of Cecilia Braslavsky, educationist and erstwhile director of the International Bureau of Education of UNESCO. She has two daughters, sociologist Paula-Irene Villa Braslavsky and Carolina Klockow.

Braslavsky has worked extensively in the domain of photobiology and she is a specialist in experimental photooptoacoustics. She was senior research scientist and Professor at the Max Planck Institute for Radiation Chemistry (now renamed Bioinorganic Chemistry) until her retirement in 2007.

== Scientific career ==
Braslavsky read chemistry at the University of Buenos Aires but left Argentina after the "night of the long batons". While being a research assistant in Santiago de Chile she defended her PhD at the University of Buenos Aires. Following temporary positions at Penn State University (1969-1972), the National University of Rio Cuarto, Argentina (1972-1975), again Penn State (1975) and the University of Alberta in Edmonton, Canada (1975), she moved to the Max Planck Institute for Radiation Chemistry in Mülheim, Germany (1976), where she stayed until her retirement in 2007.

== Functions ==
Braslavsky holds numerous official positions in the scientific field of chemistry. Since 2000 she is the chair of the IUPAC subcommittee on photochemistry. Since 2006 she is a corresponding member of CONICET and is a member of the international scientific advisory committee of INQUIMAE (Institute for Chemistry of Materials, Environment and Energy). Currently, she is chair and main organiser of the 16th International Conference on Photobiology, to be held in Cordoba, Argentina in 2014. Since 2010 she is a member of the representative panel of the RCAA (Red de Científicos Argentinos en Alemania, i.e. the Network of Argentine Scientists in Germany).

== Honours and awards ==
This is selection of her honours and awards:

- 1998 first women to be awarded the Research Award of the American Society for Photobiology.
- 2004 Elhuyar-Goldschmidt Prize of the Spanish and German chemical society.
- 2008 first woman to be awarded a Doctor Honoris Causa from the Universitat Ramon Llull, Barcelona, Spain.
- 2011 “Raíces” Prize by the Minister of Science (MINCYT) in Argentina in recognition of her engagement for the scientific cooperation between Argentina and Germany.
- 2013 Honorary Professor at Universidad Nacional de la Plata, Argentina and distinguished visiting professor Universidad Nacional de Cordoba, Argentina
- 2016 Dr. honoris causa Universidad de Buenos Aires, Argentina.
- 2017 European Society of Photobiology, Medal “for outstanding and sustained contributions to the science and promotion of Photobiology”.
- 2019 International Union on Photobiology, Finsen Medal for “Lifetime Achievement in Photochemistry and Photosensory Biology” (Barcelona).
- 2019 International Photoacoustic and Photothermal Association (IPPA). Senior Prize (Moscow).
- 2020 Corresponding Member (Académica) of the Argentine National Academy of Sciences (ANC, Córdoba, Argentina).
- 2020-21 European Photochemical Association (EPA). “Photochemistry Ambassador” for “Service to the Photochemical Community”. International Congress on Photochemistry, Geneva, 2021. The EPA established the Award in 2018 to recognize outstanding service to the Photochemistry/Photophysical community. This prize is delivered every two years.

== Partial bibliography ==
- "Time-Resolved Photothermal and Photoacoustic Methods Applied to Photoinduced Processes in Solution", S.E. Braslavsky, G.E. Heibel, Chem. Rev. 92, 1381-1410 (1992). doi: 10.1021/cr00014a007
- "Effect of Solvent on the Radiative Decay of Singlet Molecular Oxygen a(^{1}Δg)", R.D. Scurlock, S. Nonell, S.E. Braslavsky, P.R. Ogilby, J. Phys. Chem. 99, 3521-3526 (1995). doi: 10.1021/j100011a019
- '"Glossary of Terms Used in Photochemistry'", 3rd Version (IUPAC Recommendations 2006), S.E.Braslavsky, Pure Appl. Chem. 79, 293-461 (2007). doi:10.1351/pac200779030293
- '"Glossary of Terms Used in Photocatalysis and Radiation Catalysis'" (IUPAC recommendations 2011) S.E. Braslavsky, A.M. Braun, A.E. Cassano, A.V. Emeline, M.I. Litter, L. Palmisano, V.N. Parmon, N. Serpone, Pure Appl. Chem. 83, 931-1014 (2011). doi:10.1351/PAC-REC-09-09-36
