= Martina Löw =

German sociologist

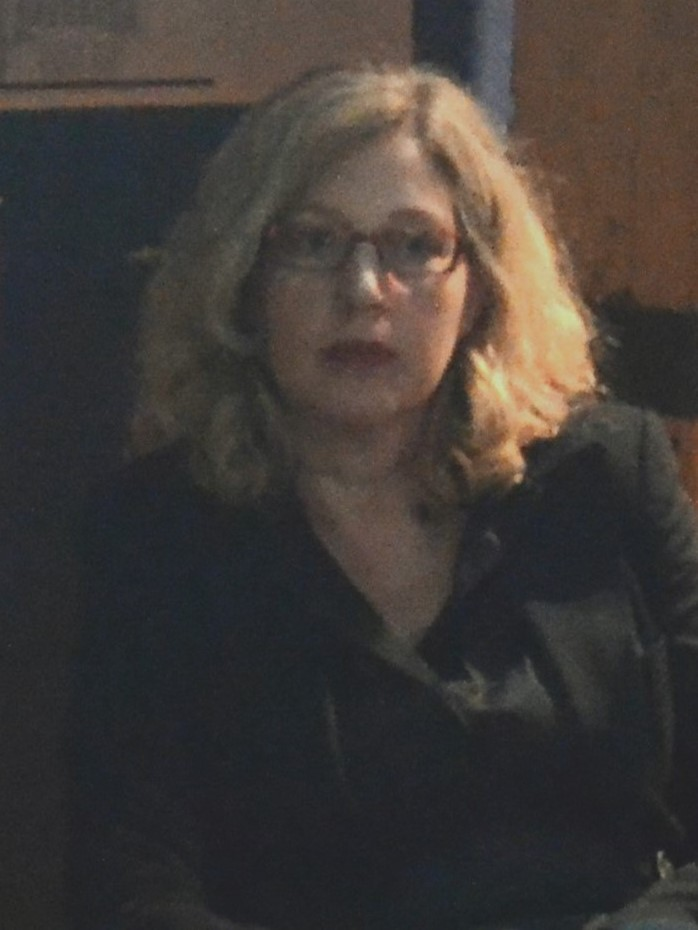
- Löw in 2011
- Born: 9 January 1965 (age 61); Würzburg
- Education: Goethe University Frankfurt
- Known for: Sociology of space
- Scientific career
- Fields: Sociology
- Workplaces: Technische Universität Berlin; Technische Universität Darmstadt

Martina Löw (born 9 January 1965 in Würzburg, West Germany) is a German sociologist.

== Vita ==
Martina Löw, former president of the German Sociological Association; Professor of sociology/sociology of architecture and planning at Technische Universität Berlin; Director of Collaborative Research Centre SFB 1265 “Re-Figuration of Spaces” in Berlin. In January 2023 the ranking website Academic Influence ranked her #3 of "Influential Women in Sociology from the Last 10 Years."

== Work ==
In 2001, Martina Löw published the study Soziologie des Raums, a major contribution to a previously neglected area of sociology. The book translated into many different languages addressed the complex ways in which spaces are socially constructed and in turn structure everyday life. Löw understands space as a relational arrangement of social goods and living beings produced by an operation of synthesis and placement of these elements. Space conceived as an ongoing, dynamic process contrasts with the traditional view that space is a static (pre-existing) background to the social processes under study, which had previously prevailed in sociology.

In the field of urban research, Löw is widely known for a new approach to analyzing the “intrinsic logic of cities”. This logic implies a complex ensemble of knowledge stocks, means of expressions, and manifestations, which are intrinsically related and based on rule-governed, routinized forms of actions stabilized by specific resources. This line of argument implies that, over time, cities condense into distinct provinces of meaning. In the field of urban sociology, Martina Löw is internationally recognized as an urban research expert known for having developed a fresh approach to the analysis of the intrinsic logic of cities. This new concept captures a complex, dynamic array of forms of knowledge and expressions that are structurally related, based on rule-governed, routinized forms of (inter)action stabilized through various resources, which contribute to cities condensing into characteristic “provinces of meaning”.

In 2008 – 2013, Löw was director of the collaborative project „Intrinsic Logic of Cities “, a joint research venture of the Technische Universität Darmstadt and Darmstadt University of Applied Sciences, sponsored by the Hessian Ministry of Higher Education, Research and the Arts as part of the program “Offensive for the development of scientific and economic excellence (LOEWE) “. In methodically structured comparative studies, the research project analysed the fundamental structures of cities in Europe and Brazil, their similarities, differences, and relationships. The intrinsic-logic approach differs from most other methodologies in urban research studies, which do research in cities but fail to account for the structures shaping the city under investigation, assuming it to be a given fact that requires no further examination. By exploring the intrinsic logic of cities, however, the city becomes a research object in its own right.

Since 2018, Löw is Director of the Collaborative Research Centre SFB 1265 “Re-Figuration of Spaces“ sponsored by the German Research Foundation DFG. Research focuses on the radical global re-ordering of spaces over the past decades theoretically conceived as re-figuration of spaces. The key argument is that alongside the traditional spatial figure of territorial space, multiple competing spatial figures are now impacting the new spatial order and communicative actions. The observable pluralization of (often conflicting) spatial figures has far-reaching consequences for sociality and social cohesion; on the individual level it is often experienced as a general sense of being overwhelmed and losing control. Together with Jörg Stollmann, she is currently leading the research project ‘Smart People: Queer Everyday Life in Digitalized Spaces’, as part of the Collaborative Research Centre SFB 1265 in Berlin.

== Books and articles ==
- 2022 Communicative Constructions and the Refiguration of Spaces (with Christmann, G. and Knoblauch, H.). London: Routledge.
- 2022 Fabrication of Space: The Design of Everyday Life in South Korean Songdo (with Bartmanski, D.; Kim, S.; Löw, M.; Pape, T.; & Stollmann, J.):. In: Urban Studies. online first https://doi.org/10.1177/00420980221115051
- 2021 Comparison, Refiguration, and Multiple Spatialities (with Knoblauch, H.). In: Qualitative Sozialforschung / Forum: Qualitative Social Research, 22(3). Vol. 22, No. 3, p. 1-17, https://doi.org/10.17169/fqs-22.3.3791
- 2021 Space. Urban, Rural, Territorial. In: B. Hollstein, R. Greshoff, U. Schimank, A. Weiß (ed.), Sociology in the German Speaking World. Special Issue Soziologische Revue, p. 499-514.
- 2020 The Spatial Refiguration of Society and the Interaction Orders (with Knoblauch, H.). In: Space and Culture, Vol. 23 (3): 221–225.
- 2019 Social and Spatial Uncertainty and Inequality: The Refiguration of Spaces as Today’s Challenge for Cities. In: M. Smagacz-Poziemska u.a. (ed.): Inequality and Uncertainty. Current Challenges for Cities. London: Palgrave Macmillan, p. 23-41.
- 2017 Spatial Sociology: Relational Space After the Turn (with Martin, F.). Current Sociology Monographs, 65(4).
- 2016 The Sociology of Space – Materiality, Social Structures and Action. Cultural Sociology, Palgrave Macmillan, New York.
- 2015 Managing the urban commons: Public interest and the representation of interconnectedness In: Christian Borch und Martin Kornberger (ed.), Urban Commons: Rethinking the City, Routledge, p. 109-126.
- 2013 The City as Experiential Space: The Production of Shared Meaning, in: International Journal of Urban and Regional Research Vol. 37/3, p. 894-908.
- 2008 The Constitution of Space: The Structuration of Spaces Through the Simultaneity of Effects and Perception. In: European Journal of Social Theory 1, 11.
