= Dirk Kaesler =

German sociologist and Max Weber expert

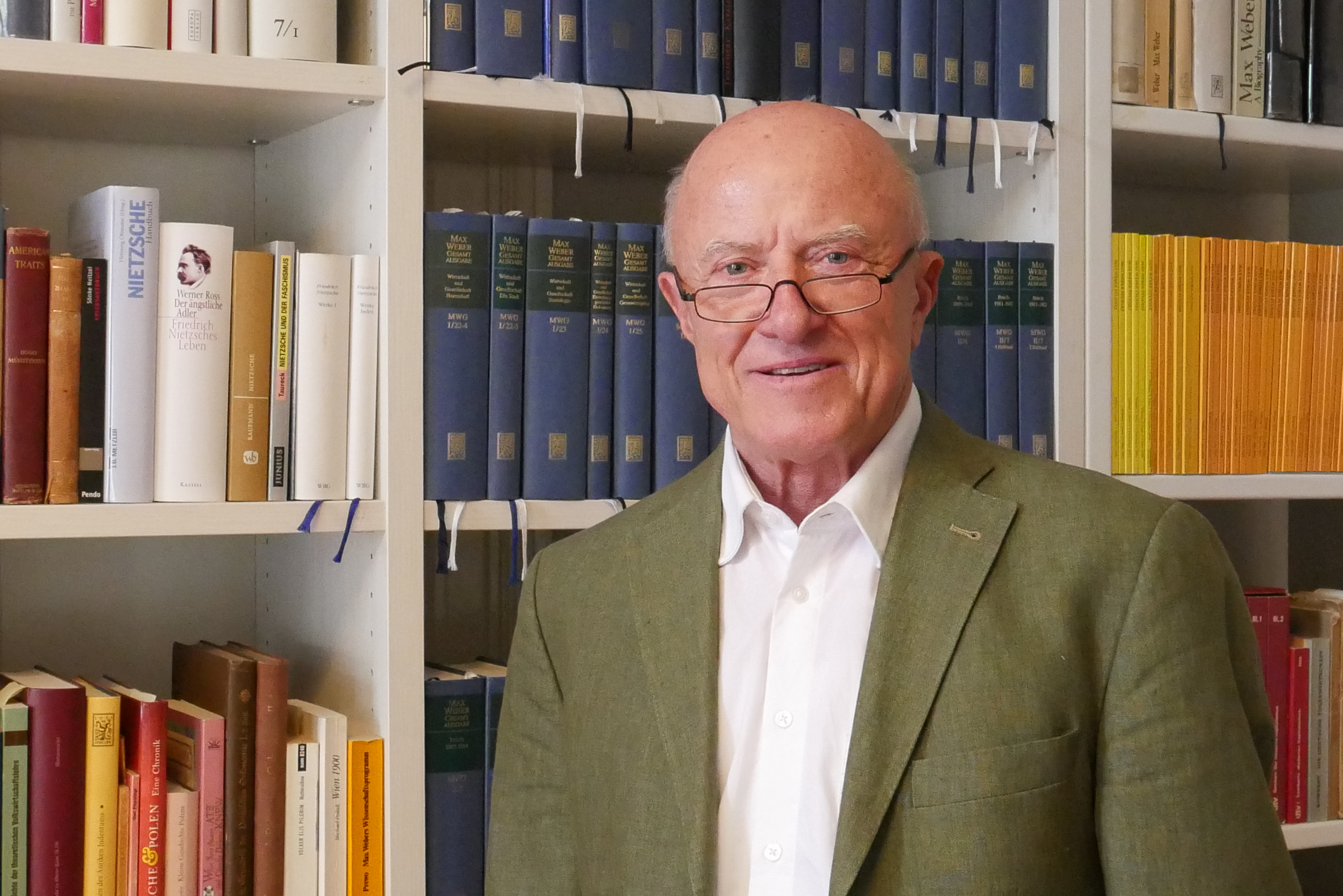
Dirk Kaesler 2018

Dirk Kaesler (born in Wiesbaden on 19 October 1944 as Dirk Käsler) is a German sociologist and Max Weber expert. Now retired, he was formerly Professor of Sociology at the University of Marburg. Since October 2018 he is Life Member of Clare Hall, Cambridge. He is the author of Max Weber: An Introduction to his Life and Work, first published by the University of Chicago Press in 1988. In 2014, he published Max Weber. Preusse, Denker, Muttersohn, which was a biography of Weber that focused on his complexities as a person.
