= Günter Maschke =

German political scientist (1943–2022)

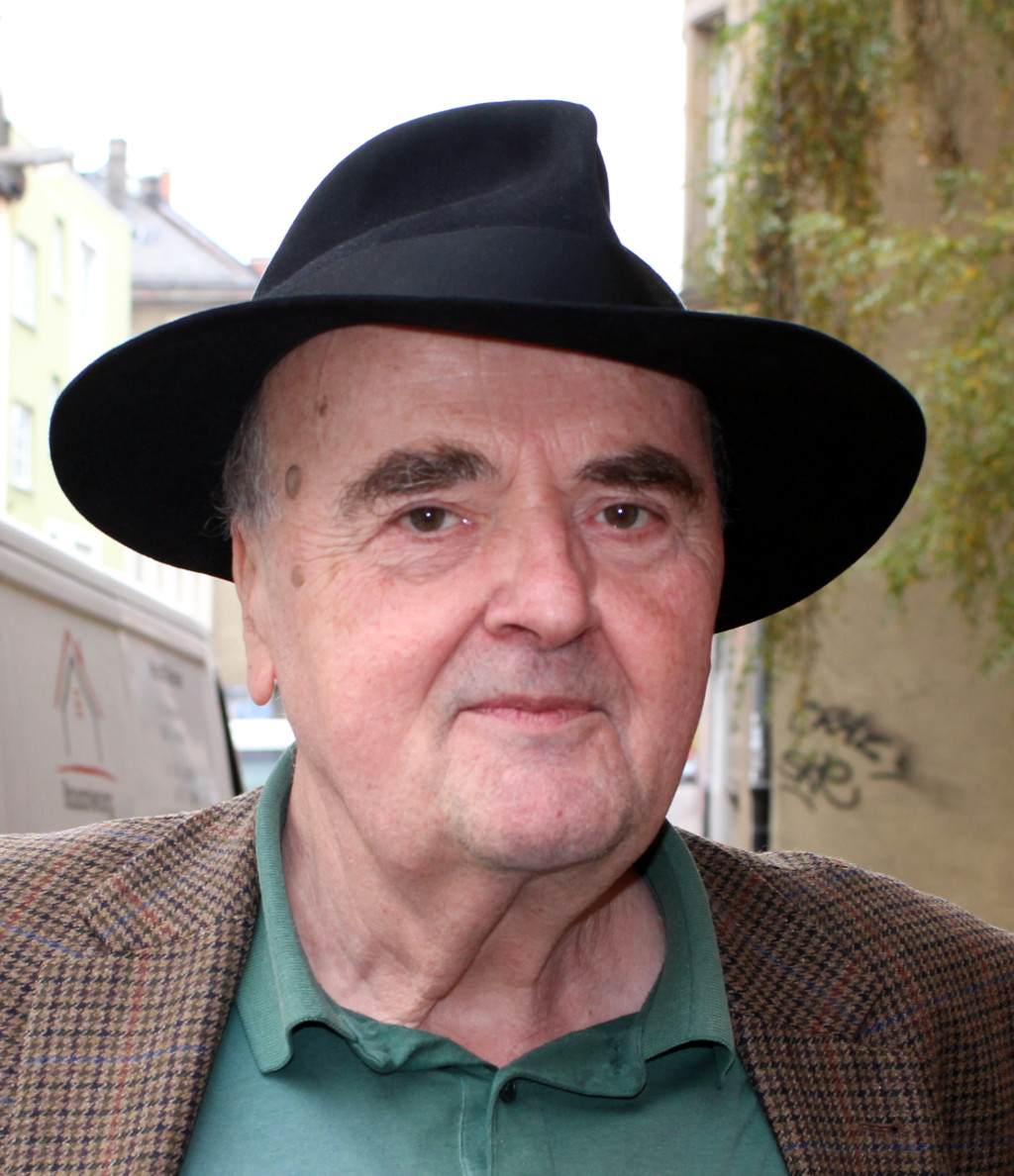
- Maschke in 2015
- Born: 15 January 1943; Erfurt, Saxony, Prussia, Nazi Germany
- Died: 7 February 2022 (aged 79); Frankfurt, Hesse, Germany
- Occupation: Political scientist

Günter Maschke (15 January 1943 – 7 February 2022) was a German political scientist. He was known as a supporter of the Nouvelle Droite.

== Biography ==
An activist within the far-left in his youth, Maschke left Germany to escape military service in France, Switzerland, and Austria. Settling in Vienna, he promoted ideas of the Frankfurt School and organized extra-parliamentary opposition groups. He was arrested in 1967 for protesting against the Vietnam War and fled to Cuba, where he went into exile. There, he served in the Cuban Revolutionary Armed Forces, but was later expelled from Havana for "counter-revolutionary activities". He was then forced to return to Germany and serve a one-year prison sentence for evading military service.

After his release, Maschke became a journalist for Frankfurter Allgemeine Zeitung, but left the newspaper due to controversy over his obituary of Carl Schmitt. He then went on to study counter-revolutionary doctrinaires such as Juan Donoso Cortés and Joseph de Maistre. During this time, he worked for multiple newspapers, including Junge Freiheit.

Maschke died in Frankfurt on 7 February 2022, at the age of 79.

== Publications ==
=== Monographs ===
- Kritik des Guerillero. Zur Theorie des Volkskriegs (1973)
- Der Tod des Carl Schmitt. Apologie und Polemik (1987)
- Das bewaffnete Wort. Aufsätze aus den Jahren 1973–1993 (1997)
- „Verräter schlafen nicht“ (2011)

=== Editing ===
- Carl Schmitt. Staat – Großraum – Nomos. Arbeiten von Carl Schmitt aus den Jahren 1916–1969 (1995)
- Carl Schmitt. Frieden oder Pazifismus? Arbeiten zum Völkerrecht und zur internationalen Politik 1924–1978 (2005)
- Juan Donoso Cortés. Essay über den Katholizismus, den Liberalismus und den Sozialismus und andere Schriften aus den Jahren 1851 bis 1853 (2018)

=== Translations ===
- Außerhalb des Spiels (1971)
