= Hans Freyer =

German sociologist and philosopher (1887–1969)

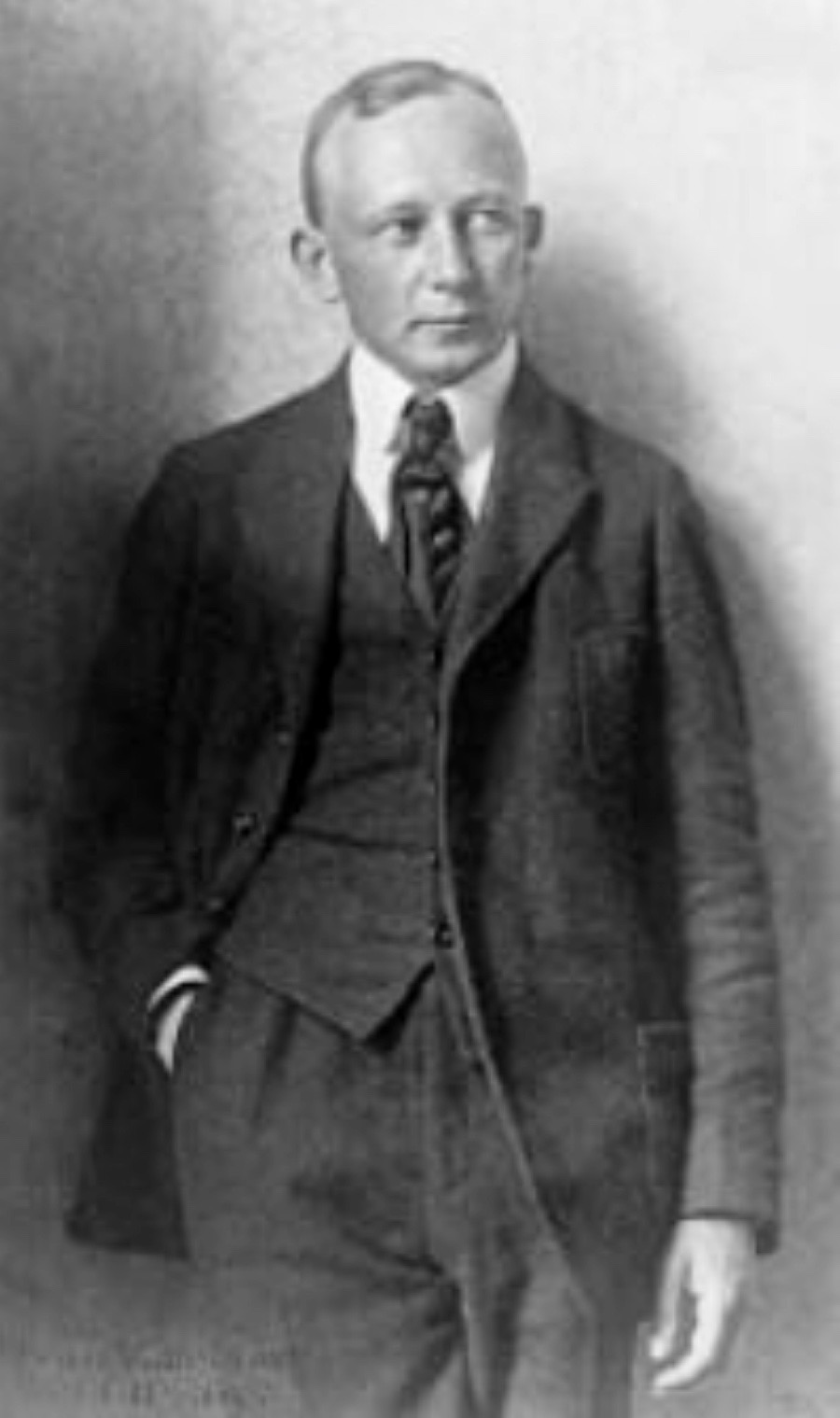
- Born: 31 July 1887; Leipzig, Germany
- Died: 18 January 1969 (aged 81); Ebersteinburg, Germany
- Known for: Leipzig School

Academic background
- Education: University of Greifswald; University of Leipzig

Academic work
- Discipline: sociology philosophy
- Institutions: University of Kiel; University of Leipzig; German Institute for Culture; Brockhaus; University of Münster
- Notable works: Der Staat

Johannes "Hans" Freyer (31 July 1887 – 18 January 1969) was a German sociologist and philosopher of the conservative revolutionary movement.

== Life ==
Freyer began studying theology, national economics, history and philosophy at the University of Greifswald in 1907, with the aim of becoming a Lutheran theologian. A year later he moved to Leipzig, where he initially took the same courses, but then gave up the theological parts. He gained his doctorate in 1911. His early works on the philosophy of life had an influence on the German youth movement. In 1920 he qualified as a university lecturer, and in 1922 he became a professor at the university of Kiel.

In 1925, moving on to the University of Leipzig, Freyer founded the university's sociology department. He led the department until 1948. In Leipzig, he developed a branch of sociology with a strongly historical basis, the Leipzig School. Sympathizing with the Hitlerite movement, he forced Ferdinand Tönnies, an outspoken enemy of it, and then president of the Deutsche Gesellschaft für Soziologie, out of office in 1933.

Also in 1933 Freyer signed the Vow of allegiance of the Professors of the German Universities and High-Schools to Adolf Hitler and the National Socialistic State. Nevertheless, being Tönnies' successor he abstained from making the Gesellschaft a Nazi tool by stopping all activities from 1934 onwards. From 1938 to 1944 Freyer was the head of the German Institute for Culture in Budapest. Together with Walter Frank he established a racist and anti-semitic völkisch historiography.

Freyer was Protestant and married Käthe Lübeck; they had four children together.

After the Second World War, Freyer's position in Leipzig, now in the Soviet occupation zone, became untenable, and in 1948 he took up a position in Wiesbaden at the Brockhaus publishing company. He took up lecturing again for only another three years, from 1953 to 1955, at the University of Münster and for a short time in 1954 in Ankara where he helped set up an institute for sociology. He was no longer able to establish himself as a full professor at a German university, but taught as an emeritus from 1953 to 1963 at the Westfälische Wilhelms-Universität in Münster. As early as 1951 he was – at the instigation of the incumbent chairman Leopold von Wiesere – admitted to the German Society for Sociology. Freyer was a member of the scientific advisory board of the Institute for Space Research.

Freyer received a pension as a retired 131er. Many of his publications date from this period. He made a big impact in the 1950s with his work The Theory of the Present Era, in which he developed a form of conservatism adaptable to the industrial age.

== Works ==
Freyer's philosophical work was influenced by Hegel, Wilhelm Dilthey, Friedrich Nietzsche, and Oswald Spengler.

=== Weimar Republic: Philosophy of Life and Conservative Revolution ===
In 1918 his early work Antaeus – Foundation of an Ethics of Conscious Life came out, followed in 1923 by Prometheus – Ideas on the Philosophy of Culture. He gradually turned to the so-called young conservatives . He developed a hierarchically structured elitist social model. Individual freedom should be put aside in favor of collective concepts such as the leadership state and the people's community. He dealt with culture criticism in his works u. a. with advancing mechanization and developed the "Theory of Secondary Systems".

In 1926, in Der Staat, Freyer described the interrelated dimensions of history, which in his view repeat in a circular fashion: faith, style and state. In some respects, his theory was based on Ferdinand Tönnies' Community and Society, which he did not quote in his works. In contrast to Tönnies, he described the last and highest stage, the ideal hierarchically structured state, as an ideal community with a “Fuhrer” at the top. The most important quality of this state consisted in being able to combine all the forces of the community into one unit. This ideology corresponded to the movement of the Conservative Revolution and National Socialism.

In Der Staat (1926), Freyer identified three stages of history which repeated themselves in a cycle: Glaube, Stil and Staat (belief, style, the state). These were partly, although not openly, based on Ferdinand Tönnies' Gemeinschaft und Gesellschaft (community and society), which he did not quote in his works. In contrast to Tönnies, he described the last and highest stage, the ideal hierarchically structured state, as an ideal community with a “Fuhrer" at the top. The most important quality of this state consisted in being able to combine all the forces of the community into one unit. This ideology corresponded to the movement between Conservative Revolution and National Socialism. The last stage, Staat, was the ideal state for society: "the essential quality of the state [...] was its ability to forge living humanity with all its forces into a unity.

In 1929 Freyer wrote Soziologie als Wirklichkeitswissenschaft (Sociology as a "Science of Reality") (using Max Weber's term). This looked into the origins of sociology, saying that it came from the philosophy of history; that it had emerged from people's attempts to understand the connections between the past and the present. In Freyer's view, sociology was needed as a science to understand why changes in society had happened and, based on these findings, to help transform society.

Freyer's 1931 article Die Revolution von Rechts studied freedom, saying that people should be free only if they were part of a common will and that individual freedom should be limited for the sake of the community. The "revolution" is a matter for the "toughest" and "strongest" people of all political tendencies.

=== National Socialism: Radical Intellectual Connections ===
During the National Socialist era, further treatises appeared, some of which were close to the Nazi ideology and were not later published again. In the post-war period, Freyer was widely criticized in academia alongside his pupil Arnold Gehlen as well as Ernst Jünger and Martin Heidegger as a spiritual forerunner and supporter of National Socialism.

Freyer is considered a convinced National Socialist, which is particularly evident in his work Pallas Athene. Ethics of the political people (Jena, 1935). There he writes that conscience must become political and thereby anti-individualistic and anti-universalistic. Such a political conscience is prepared for and willing to use violence; political virtue is tied to the people, while their ethos lies in the destruction of the enemy. The leader who refers radically to this plan embodies the will of the people, which must be shaped through race, discipline, education, violence and coercion. Such a people, which constitutes itself in war, remains politically in war at all hours; to ascend, it must tear itself apart and sacrifice.

After the end of the Second World War, the following writings by Freyer were included in the list of literature to be discarded in the Soviet occupation zone: Revolution from the Right (Diederichs, Jena 1931), The Political Semester. A proposal for university reform (Diederichs, Jena 1933), The historical self-awareness of the 20th century (Keller, Leipzig 1937), in the GDR additionally The State (Rechfelden, Leipzig 1925) and Pallas Athene (Diederichs, Jena 1935).

=== Adenauer Era: Theory of Industrial Society ===
In his post-war writings there is no fundamental break with earlier works. As before, he belonged to the representatives of an extremely conservative current and had some influence on thinking in the newly founded Federal Republic of Germany.

In 1955, Freyer developed his theory of industrial society with the historical-philosophical and sociological treatise Theory of the Present Age. In it, Freyer describes all social systems before industrialization as grown "primary systems", while the industrial age is described as a "secondary system" consciously produced by humans. In particular, he is concerned with the rapid development of industrial society in the 20th century, characterized by the expansion of technology, the displacement of small companies by large ones and the concentration of human masses in metropolitan areas. According to Freyer, state and society are less and less separated; science gains central importance.

He describes the "industrial system" that emerged from the Industrial Revolution around 1800 as a fundamental epochal change in human relations. He compares this turning point in world history with man's transition to sedentariness.

Freyer draws the conclusion that earlier descriptions of industrial society are currently (1955) no longer applicable and that new key concepts must be formulated. He criticizes the historical "illusion of progress" in Marxism, which assumes that the new human being will be created automatically. On the other hand, he considers alienation to be the normal human condition in industrial society. He also opposes "modern chiliasm ". He sees the kingdom of God as a future secularized “paradise of civilization”. Although he rejects all historical optimism, he approves of cultural criticism. Philosophers of history, who conjure up an ongoing "crisis myth" and want to condemn and limit technical development, do not agree. Rather, he assumes that technical progress is an important part of the industrial age. Freyer refers to the balance between "technology negation" and "technology glorification".

As a way forward in the industrial age, he emphasizes the value of conservative thinking and acting for the present (1955). Freyer sees the combination of progress and perseverance as the "secret" of history. Accordingly, the forces of mankind grow out of tradition. The representatives of the Conservative Revolution and the conservative reformers acted accordingly. However, recourse to tradition should not refer to “primitive instincts” or “primeval things”, but to the “unused” forces that can be mobilized “without falsification” from the “deep layers” of human heritage, which become active under the conditions of modern times and thus show their ability to change. His aim was to combine conservatism with a "modern" theory of industrial society. These views had great influence in the Adenauer era (Richard Hiscocks).

== List of works ==
- Antäus. Grundlegung einer Ethik des bewußten Lebens, 1918
- Die Bewertung der Wirtschaft im philosophischen Denken des 19. Jahrhunderts, 1921
- Prometheus. Ideen zur Philosophie der Kultur, 1923
- Theorie des objektiven Geistes. Eine Einleitung in die Kulturphilosophie, 1923
- Der Staat, 1925
- Soziologie als Wirklichkeitswissenschaft. Logische Grundlegung des Systems der Soziologie, 1930
- Einleitung in die Soziologie, 1931
- Die Revolution von rechts, 1931
- Herrschaft und Planung. Zwei Grundbegriffe der politischen Ethik, 1933
- Das Politische Semester, 1933
- Pallas Athene. Ethik des politischen Volkes, 1935
- Über Fichtes Machiavelli-Aufsatz, 1936
- Die politische Insel. Eine Geschichte der Utopien von Platon bis zur Gegenwart, 1936
- Vom geschichtlichen Selbstbewußtsein des 20. Jahrhunderts, 1937
- Gesellschaft und Geschichte, 1937
- Machiavelli, 1938
- Weltgeschichte Europas, 2 Bände, 1948
- Theorie des gegenwärtigen Zeitalters, 1955
- Schwelle der Zeiten. Beiträge zur Soziologie der Kultur, 1965
- Entwicklungstendenzen und Probleme der modernen Industriegesellschaft, in: Industriegesellschaft in Ost und West, Mainz
- Herrschaft, Planung und Technik. Aufsätze zur Soziologie, published and introduced by Elfriede Üner, 1987

== See also ==
- Arnold Gehlen
- Gotthard Günther
- Ernest Manheim
- Heinz Maus
- Helmut Schelsky
