= Emerich K. Francis =

Austrian-American sociologist

Emerich Francis
- Born: Emerich Klaus Franzis; 27 June 1906; Gablonz, Bohemia, Austro-Hungarian Empire
- Died: 14 January 1994; Munich, Bavaria, Germany
- Education: University of Innsbruck; Charles University; University of Münster
- Occupations: Sociologist; University teacher Journalist-editor
- Employer(s): University of Winnipeg; University of Notre Dame; Ludwig-Maximilians-Universität München; University of Innsbruck
- Spouse: Gisela Schweizer
- Children: 1 s

Emerich Francis (born Emerich Franzis: 27 June 1906 – 14 January 1994) was an Austrian-American sociologist. He is also identified in some sources under the pseudonym that he sometimes used as "Junius". His emigration from what had become, by 1939, part of Nazi Germany, appears to have been undertaken as a result of his (hitherto, to most people, unknown) Jewish provenance. During the 1930s his work had a German-nationalist focus, and dealt in particular with ethnic and religious minorities. After 1945 his contributions became more theoretical and less overtly political.

== Life ==
=== Provenance and early years ===
Emerich Klaus Franzis was born at Gablonz (as Jablonec nad Nisou was known before 1945), a midsized trading and manufacturing town northeast of Prague, in the mountain foothills of northern Bohemia, which at that time was part of the Austro-Hungarian empire. Both his parents had converted from Judaism before he was born: that was something of which he remained unaware through much of his childhood. He grew up in a Catholic home in Innsbruck, however. This meant that despite being born in what became, after 1918, Czechoslovakia, he was nevertheless able to retain his Austrian citizenship after the postwar break-up of Austria-Hungary. After passing his school final exams he was briefly apprenticed as a typesetter. He then studied for two terms during 1924/25 at the University of Innsbruck where he embarked on courses at the Philosophy and Arts ("Philosophisch-Kulturwissenschaften") Faculties. In 1926 he moved on to Prague where he studied a wide range of subjects, including Germanistics, Philosophy, Pedagogy, Psychology, Social History and what then counted as Mainstream History. His student years were concluded with a period at the University of Münster where, subsequently, he took a junior academic post as a research assistant at the "German Institute for Foreign Trade" ("... Institut für Auslandkunde") which he would retain for three years, between 1930 and 1933.

=== Student years, local journalism and escape ===
Prague University during the 1920s and 1930s was the focus of intensifying nationalist polarisation: as a student there Francis joined the "Hochschulbund des Staffelstein", an elite Catholic-Nationalist "Volksdeutsche" association that opposed Czechoslovak nationalism. He openly rejected his Jewish provenance, presenting himself instead as a committed Roman Catholic and German nationalist. Meanwhile, in 1930 he received his doctorate from Prague University for a dissertation on the educational aspects of Bernard Bolzano's work. As a postgraduate student in Prague he also supported himself both through journalism and by working as a home tutor to families from the Bohemian nobility. During 1933, which was his final year in Münster, he worked as an assistant to Georg Schreiber, a church historian and (since 1905) ordained priest who, till the National Socialist take-over, combined his career as a university professor with an active role as a (Catholic) Centre Party politician. After this he returned to Bohemia where he worked till early 1939 as editor in chief, at the "Volkszeitung" (a Catholic newspaper) based in Warnsdorf which was linguistically and ethnically still, at this stage, a German town, despite having been politically part of Czechoslovakia since 1919. During 1935 Emerich Francis married Gisela Schweizer from nearby Leitmeritz. The couple's son was born in March 1939, but Emerich Francis only met his boy in 1947 when the family were reunited in the United States. In September 1938 the region was incorporated into the newly enlarged German state as the "Reichsgau Sudetenland". In 1938 Francis was still insisting on his Catholicism but by early 1939, unable any longer to conceal his Jewish provenance, Emerich Francis fled to the South Tyrol (Alto Adige), which since 1919 had been part of Italy. From Italy he made his way to England.

=== Exile, internment and Manitoba ===
In England, Francis lived for some months in seclusion at Prinknash Abbey, in a Benedictine monastery near Gloucester. One source indicates that he was hoping to become a monk or a priest. However, in May 1940, eight months after the outbreak of the Second World War, but just a few days after the German army invaded France, the British government invoked legislation that triggered a massive round-up of so-called "enemy aliens". Those hastily arrested included several thousand Jewish refugees from Nazi Germany. He was extracted from his monastic refuge, becomings one of several thousand foreigners hastily placed in internment camps, at some stage incarcerated on the Isle of Man. As the summer progressed the internment policy became progressively more controversial with members of the British political class: many foreign internees were shipped overseas. Francis was one of those now sent for internment to Sherbrooke, Quebec. He was released in 1942, initially employed as an "agricultural worker", and ending up at the trappist monastery in the St. Norbert neighbourhood of Winnipeg, capital of the mid-western Canadian province of Manitoba. Several sources describe his professional career over the next couple of years as "adventurous". He was employed variously as an orphanage care assistant, a gardner and a bank clerk. At one point, taking advantage of his vocational training during the 1920s, he was able to take skilled work as a typesetter. In his spare time he studied to master the English language and, later, to familiarize himself with the (still, especially in Canada, relatively underdeveloped) Anglo-American world of Social science.

=== Relaunch of an academic career ===
During 1945 Francis briefly taught German at United College (today the University of Winnipeg)). He also helped out at the Political sciences department. As matters turned out, this marked a return to the academic life for which he had been trained before 1933. Later that year the Historical and Scientific Society of Manitoba asked Francis to undertake a detailed study of one of the ethnic groups in Manitoba. For a number of reasons he selected the Russian Mennonites, an Anabaptist religious group, committed to pacifism, many of whom still spoke a version of Low German, known as Plautdietsch, as their first language. Since his release from internment in 1942 Francis had already come across various Mennonite communities. He was able to receive help from others, notably the scholar-businessman (and "fervent Mennonite") Ted Friesen, who dedicated a considerable amount of time to driving Francis round the countryside, between the East and West Mennonite "reserves". Friesen later recalled that although Francis was, on most occasions, perfectly able to understand the Plautdietsch dialect he encountered during his researches, he always insisted on conducting his interviews in High German.Francis was able to devote himself full-time to the project, since the Historical and Scientific Society, which had commissioned the work, backed him with a fellowship which provided support from September 1945 till March 1947. He also continued to teach German and assist the embryonic sociology department at the university. While undertaking his study Francis was able to cultivate the Winnipeg historian William Lewis Morton, with whom he had much in common personally and politically. Morton became an ally in the search to try and find a publisher for the substantial book that the research work could support. In the event the book in question was published only in 1955 due to issues over permissions (from the Historical Society that had sponsored the research) to publish and a succession of disagreements with the University of Toronto Press on matters such as the inclusion of large numbers of (expensive to reproduce) tables and appendices, along with the ticklish question of whether and how much the original manuscript might be edited down. Nevertheless, long before that the Mennonite research had formed the basis for several well based academic papers. Even though many of the audiences from the Historical and Scientific society to whom he presented his findings were more appreciative of the historical narratives included in his work than in the extensive demographic, ecological and institutional analyses, many of them delivered by means of a formidable battery of number based charts and tables, by 1947 Francis was already establishing himself in North America as a social scientist of note. The subject was not yet widely taught outside continental Europe, but that would change during the 1950s and 1960s.

=== Indiana ===
In 1947 Francis accepted an assistant professorship at the Catholic University of Notre Dame, located across the border at South Bend, Indiana. The brief was "to help develop a doctoral programme in sociology". There is more than a hint that the appointment resulted as much from personal networking as from the reputation Francis was establishing at Winnipeg. The Notre Dame dean had come across Francis in the early 1930s at the University of Münster and, it would appear, been appropriately impressed. During nearly twelve years at Notre Dame, Francis continued to publish articles on sociology, choosing high-profile academic journals in America, Britain and West Germany, which did much to establish him, in the words of one commentator, "as a sociological scholar of stature". In 1950, he accepted an extraordinary professorship and in 1954 a full professorship from Notre Dame. In 1954 Francis took US citizenship. This was also the year in which he undertook his first visit to Europe since 1939. He was able to re-establish contact with friends from his school days in Innsbruck and from the years he had spent in Bohemia. It is clear from a letter he wrote to a friend on 1 February 1955 that the trip left him profoundly homesick. During the next two years he took on visiting professorships at both the University of Innsbruck and the Ludwig-Maximilians-Universität München.

=== Munich ===
In 1955, Francis applied for the newly instituted chair in Sociology at the Ludwig-Maximilians-Universität München. The chair came with the opportunity to create the university's new Institute of Sociology. His appointment was opposed by the Bavarian Minister for Education and Culture, August Rucker. Even after the minister's favoured candidate turned down the position, Rucker continued to oppose the appointment of Emerich Francis to it. The vacancy as envisaged remained unfilled: Alfred von Martin administered the new sociology department, but von Martin was by now in his mid-70s and contributions he made between 1955 and 1958 appear to have made relatively little impression. In the end it took a change of government to open the way for Francis. The coalition government of Wilhelm Hoegner fell in October 1957 and Rucker lost his ministerial position. Emerich Francis took up the teaching chair in sociology at the Ludwig-Maximilians-Universität München. Francis remained in post at Munich till his retirement in 1974. Admirers record with obvious regret that his "list of publications in journals after 1958 is rather sparse". In 1967, his responsibilities were added to when he accepted a part-time Honorarprofessor position at the University of Innsbruck. There is a sense that setting up the new Institute of Sociology and the quantity of teaching he found himself doing left little time either for writing or for "hiking in the Alps" beyond Garmisch.

== Awards and honours (selection) ==
- 1985 Federal Cross of Merit 1st Class Bundesverdienstkreuz 1. Klasse

== Published output (selection) ==
- Bernard Bolzano. Der pädagogische Gehalt seiner Lehre, zugleich ein Beitrag zur Geistesgeschichte des ostmitteleuropäischen Raumes. 1933.
- In Search of Utopia. The Mennonites in Manitoba. 1955.
- Wissenschaftliche Grundlagen soziologischen Denkens. 2nd edition. Francke, Bern/ München 1960. (1st edition 1957)
- Ethnos und Demos. Soziologische Beiträge zur Volkstheorie. Duncker & Humblot, Berlin 1965.
- Interethnic Relations. An Essay in Sociological Theory. 1976.
