= Formal sociology =

Formal sociology is a scientific approach to sociology developed by Georg Simmel and Leopold von Wiese. In his studies, Simmel was more focused on forms of social interactions than content. Thus his approach to sociology was labeled formal sociology. In formal sociology, one formal concept can be applied to understand various events. In Simmel's view, one form of a social phenomenon is always associated with many formal events. Formal sociology aims to show that despite social interactions' complex processes, forms can be isolated and may even be identical.
