= Kölner Zeitschrift für Soziologie und Sozialpsychologie =

- Discipline: Sociology, Social psychology
- Language: German

Publication details
- History: 1921–present
- Frequency: Quarterly

Standard abbreviations
- ISO 4: Köln. Z. Soziol. Sozialpsychol.

Indexing
- ISSN: 0023-2653 (print); 1861-891X (web)

Links
- Journal homepage

The Kölner Zeitschrift für Soziologie und Sozialpsychologie (Cologne Journal for Sociology and Social Psychology) is a German academic journal for sociology. It has an empirical focus on social research, both qualitatively and quantitatively, often in the tradition of Max Weber's "Verstehende Soziologie" (Interpretive Sociology). Articles are usually published in German with an abstract in English.

== History ==
The journal's roots go back to the Kölner Vierteljahreshefte für Sozialwissenschaften (Cologne Quarterly of Social Sciences), founded in 1921 by the German sociologist Leopold von Wiese. Both journals were discontinued in 1934. Other editors of the Kölner Vierteljahrshefte für Soziologie included Theodor Brauer, Christian Eckert, and Hugo Lindemann.

After World War II it was again von Wiese who refounded the journal as ”Kölner Zeitschrift für Soziologie” in 1948. Under his successor René König, the quarterly soon expanded to social psychological subjects, which was reflected by the once again changed name.

Editors of the journal are Cornelia Kristen (Otto-Friedrich-Universität Bamberg), Thomas Schwinn (Ruprecht-Karls-Universität Heidelberg) and Michael Wagner (Universität zu Köln).
