= German Sociological Association =

The German Sociological Association (Deutsche Gesellschaft für Soziologie, DGS) is a professional organization of social scientists in Germany. Established in Berlin on January 3, 1909, its founding members included Rudolf Goldscheid, Ferdinand Tönnies, Max Weber, and Georg Simmel. Its first president was Tönnies, who was forced out of office by the Nazi regime in 1933; his successor, Hans Freyer, attempted to reform the DGS on Nazi lines but ultimately decided to suspend its activities the following year. The DGS was revived after World War II under the chairmanship of Leopold von Wiese in 1946, and has remained active since then, with about 3,200 members as of 2019.

== Presidents and chairpersons ==
The following members have served as heads of the organization:

- 1909–1933: Ferdinand Tönnies as president (Präsident)
- 1933: Werner Sombart, Leopold von Wiese, and Hans Freyer unconstitutionally as joint chairs (Vorsitzende)
- 1933–1934: Hans Freyer as chair; suspended the DGS in 1934
- 1946–1955: Leopold von Wiese; office titled president
- 1955–1959: Helmuth Plessner
- 1959–1963: Otto Stammer
- 1963–1967: Theodor W. Adorno
- 1967–1970: Ralf Dahrendorf; office titled chair
- 1970: Erwin K. Scheuch (interim chair)
- 1971–1974: M. Rainer Lepsius
- 1974–1978: Karl Martin Bolte
- 1979–1982: Joachim Matthes
- 1983–1986: Burkart Lutz
- 1987–1990: Wolfgang Zapf
- 1991–1992: Bernhard Schäfers
- 1993–1994: Lars Clausen
- 1995–1998: Stefan Hradil
- 1999–2002: Jutta Allmendinger
- 2003–2007: Karl-Siegbert Rehberg
- 2007–2011: Hans-Georg Soeffner
- 2011–2013: Martina Löw
- 2013–2017: Stephan Lessenich
- 2017–2019: Nicole Burzan
- 2019–2021: Birgit Blättel-Mink
- 2021–2025: Paula-Irene Villa Braslavsky
