= Leipzig school (sociology) =

School of thought in 1930s German sociology

The Leipzig school was a branch of sociology developed by a group of academics led by philosopher and sociologist Hans Freyer at the University of Leipzig, Germany in the 1930s.

Freyer saw Nazism as an opportunity; many of his followers were politically active Nazis. They included Arnold Gehlen, Gunter Ipsen, Karl Heinz Pfeffer, and Helmut Schelsky.

The National Socialist German Workers Party (Nazi Party) did not allow any competing ideologies to develop in universities; however, some of the Leipzig School group remained at the university until 1945. Their numbers declined as some emigrated (Günther) or made a career in the Third Reich (Gehlen, Ipsen, Pfeffer), and before the war ended, Freyer himself left to take up a teaching position at the University of Budapest.
