= René König =

German sociologist (1906–1992)

René König (5 July 1906 – 21 March 1992) was a German sociologist. He was very influential on West German sociology after 1949.

== Biography ==
Born in Magdeburg, he 1925 took up Philosophy, Psychology, Ethnology, and Islamic Studies at the Universities of Vienna and Berlin. He gained his doctorate (Dr. phil.) 1930 at the Berlin University. As an enemy of the Nazis, he could not obtain his post-doctoral degree (Habilitation) in the Reich, so he emigrated to Switzerland in 1937 and passed the examination at the university of Zürich, 1938. By then, he was strongly influenced by Émile Durkheim, Maurice Halbwachs, and Marcel Mauss. 1949, he was called to the chair of Sociology at Cologne University, where he built up what was to be known later as the "Cologne School" (Kölner Schule) and established the Kölner Zeitschrift für Soziologie und Sozialpsychologie. He never left this university, in spite of several calls, and became Professor Emeritus in 1974, dying at Cologne 1992.

He never gave up cultural studies writing the first sociology of fashion, but at the same time he was a German pioneer of empirical methods, as against the ideological biases of many contemporal colleagues.

He played as well an important role in the International Sociological Association. He was the fifth president of ISA (1962-1966).

Besides, he was en engaged liberal writer and essayist, and translated the novelist Giovanni Verga from the Italian into German.

The René König Society (René-König-Gesellschaft) is publishing a complete edition of his writings.
