= Talcott Parsons =

American sociologist (1902–1979)

- Born: December 13, 1902; Colorado Springs, Colorado, US
- Died: May 8, 1979 (aged 76); Munich, West Germany
- Spouse: Helen Bancroft Walker (m. 1927)
- Children: 3, including Charles

Academic background
- Education: Amherst College; London School of Economics; Heidelberg University
- Doctoral advisor: Edgar Salin
- Influences: Émile Durkheim; Walton Hale Hamilton; Lawrence Joseph Henderson; Vilfredo Pareto; Max Weber; Alfred North Whitehead

Academic work
- Discipline: Sociology
- School or tradition: Structural functionalism
- Institutions: Harvard University
- Doctoral students: Robert F. Bales; Robert N. Bellah; Joseph Berger; Frank Bonilla; Albert K. Cohen; Renée Fox; Harold Garfinkel; Clifford Geertz; Miriam M. Johnson; Edward Laumann; Marion J. Levy Jr.; Jean Lipman-Blumen; Wilbert E. Moore; Jesse R. Pitts; Jackson Toby; Pierre L. van den Berghe; Ezra Vogel; Morris Zelditch
- Notable students: Norman Birnbaum; Kingsley Davis; Niklas Luhmann; James Olds; Neil Smelser
- Notable works: The Structure of Social Action (1937); The Social System (1951)
- Notable ideas: Action theory; AGIL paradigm; sick role
- Influenced: Jeffrey C. Alexander; Clyde Kluckhohn; Karl Deutsch; David Easton; Jürgen Habermas; Lord Giddens; Benton Johnson; Jean-François Lyotard; Robert K. Merton; Richard Münch; Edward Shils

Talcott Parsons (December 13, 1902 – May 8, 1979) was an American sociologist of the classical tradition, best known for his social action theory and structural functionalism. Parsons is considered one of the most influential figures in sociology in the 20th century. After earning a PhD in economics, he served on the faculty at Harvard University from 1927 to 1973. In 1930, he was among the first professors in its new sociology department. Later, he was instrumental in the establishment of the Department of Social Relations at Harvard.

Based on empirical data, Parsons' social action theory was the first broad, systematic, and generalizable theory of social systems developed in the United States and Europe. Some of Parsons' largest contributions to sociology in the English-speaking world were his translations of Max Weber's work and his analyses of works by Weber, Émile Durkheim, and Vilfredo Pareto. Their work heavily influenced Parsons' view and was the foundation for his social action theory. Parsons viewed voluntaristic action through the lens of the cultural values and social structures that constrain choices and ultimately determine all social actions, as opposed to actions that are determined based on internal psychological processes. Although Parsons is generally considered a structural functionalist, towards the end of his career, in 1975, he published an article that stated that "functional" and "structural functionalist" were inappropriate ways to describe the character of his theory.

From the 1970s on, a new generation of sociologists criticized Parsons' theories as socially conservative and his writings as unnecessarily complex. Sociology courses have placed less emphasis on his theories than at the peak of his popularity (from the 1940s to the 1970s). However, there has been a recent resurgence of interest in his ideas.

Parsons was a strong advocate for the professionalization of sociology and its expansion in American academia. He was elected president of the American Sociological Association in 1949 and served as its secretary from 1960 to 1965.

== Early life ==
Parsons was born on December 13, 1902, in Colorado Springs, Colorado, to Edward Smith Parsons and Mary Augusta Ingersoll. His father had attended Yale Divinity School, was ordained as a Congregationalist minister, and served first as a minister for a pioneer community in Greeley, Colorado. At the time of Parsons' birth, his father was a professor in English and vice-president at Colorado College.

During his Congregational ministry in Greeley, Edward had become sympathetic to the Social Gospel movement but tended to view it from a higher theological position and was hostile to the ideology of socialism.

== Education ==
=== Amherst College ===
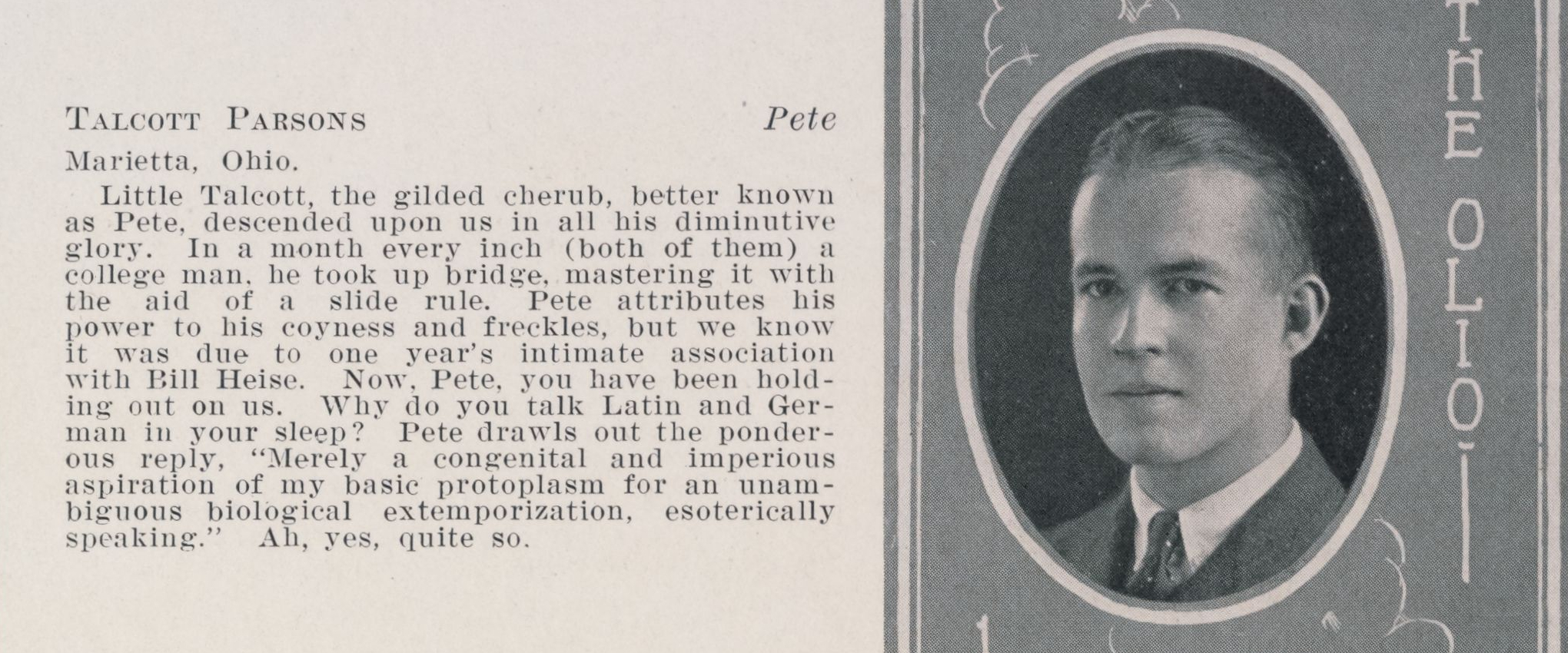
Parsons in the Amherst College yearbook, 1924

As an undergraduate, Parsons studied biology and philosophy at Amherst College and received his BA in 1924. Amherst College had become the Parsons' family college by tradition; his father and his uncle Frank had attended it, as had his elder brother, Charles Edward. Initially, Parsons was attracted to a career in medicine, as he was inspired by his elder brother so he studied a great deal of biology and spent a summer working at the Oceanographic Institution at Woods Hole, Massachusetts.

Parsons' biology professors at Amherst were Otto C. Glaser and Henry Plough. Gently mocked as "Little Talcott, the gilded cherub," Parsons became one of the student leaders at Amherst. Parsons also took courses with Walton Hale Hamilton and the philosopher Clarence Edwin Ayres, both known as "institutional economists". Hamilton, in particular, drew Parsons toward social science. They exposed him to literature by authors such as Thorstein Veblen, John Dewey, and William Graham Sumner. Parsons also took a course with George Brown in the philosophy of Immanuel Kant and a course in modern German philosophy with Otto Manthey-Zorn, who was a great interpreter of Kant. From early in his life, Parsons showed a great interest in philosophy.

Two term papers that Parsons wrote as a student for Clarence E. Ayres at Amherst have survived. They are referred to as the Amherst Papers and have been of strong interest to Parsons scholars. The first was written on December 19, 1922, "The Theory of Human Behavior in its Individual and Social Aspects." The second was written on March 27, 1923, "A Behavioristic Conception of the Nature of Morals". The papers reveal Parsons' early interest in social evolution. The Amherst Papers also reveal that Parsons did not agree with his professors since he wrote in his Amherst papers that technological development and moral progress are two structurally-independent empirical processes.

=== London School of Economics ===
After Amherst, Parsons studied at the London School of Economics for a year, where he was exposed to the work of Bronisław Malinowski, R. H. Tawney, L. T. Hobhouse, and Harold Laski. During his days at LSE, he made friends with E. E. Evans-Pritchard, Meyer Fortes, and Raymond Firth, who all participated in the Malinowski seminar. Also, he made a close personal friendship with Arthur and Eveline M. Burns.

At LSE he met Helen Bancroft Walker, a young American, and they married on April 30, 1927. The couple had three children: Anne, Charles, and Susan.

=== Heidelberg University ===
In June, Parsons went on to the Heidelberg University, where he received his PhD in sociology and economics in 1927. At Heidelberg, he worked with Alfred Weber, Max Weber's brother; Edgar Salin, his dissertation adviser; Emil Lederer; and Karl Mannheim. He was examined on Kant's Critique of Pure Reason by the philosopher Karl Jaspers. At Heidelberg, Parsons was also examined by Willy Andreas on the French Revolution. Parsons wrote his Dr. Phil. thesis on The Concept of Capitalism in the Recent German Literature, with his main focus on the work of Werner Sombart and Weber. It was clear from his discussion that he rejected Sombart's quasi-idealistic views and supported Weber's attempt to strike a balance between historicism, idealism and neo-Kantianism.

The most crucial encounter for Parsons at Heidelberg was with the work of Max Weber about whom he had never heard before. Weber became tremendously important for Parsons because his upbringing with a liberal but strongly religious father had made the question of the role of culture and religion in the basic processes of world history a persistent puzzle in his mind. Weber was the first scholar who truly provided Parsons with a compelling theoretical "answer" to the question.

Parsons decided to translate Weber's work into English and approached Marianne Weber, Weber's widow. Parsons would eventually translate several of Weber's works. His time in Heidelberg had him invited by Marianne Weber to "sociological teas", which were study group meetings that she held in the library room of her and Max's old apartment. One scholar that Parsons met at Heidelberg who shared his enthusiasm for Weber was Alexander von Schelting. Parsons later wrote a review article on von Schelting's book on Weber. Generally, Parsons read extensively in religious literature, especially works focusing on the sociology of religion. One scholar who became especially important for Parsons was Ernst D. Troeltsch. Parsons also read widely on Calvinism. His reading included the work of Emile Doumerque, Eugéne Choisy, and Henri Hauser.

== Early academic career ==
=== Harvard University ===
In 1927, after a year of teaching at Amherst (1926–1927), Parsons entered Harvard University, as an instructor in the Economics Department, where he followed F. W. Taussig's lectures on economist Alfred Marshall and became friends with the economist historian Edwin Gay, the founder of Harvard Business School. Parsons also became a close associate of Joseph Schumpeter and followed his course General Economics. Parsons was at odds with some of the trends in Harvard's department which then went in a highly technical and a mathematical direction. He looked for other options at Harvard and gave courses in "Social Ethics" and in the "Sociology of Religion".

The chance for a shift to sociology came in 1930, when Harvard's Sociology Department was created under Russian scholar Pitirim Sorokin. Parsons became one of the new department's two instructors, along with Carle Zimmerman. Parsons established close ties with biochemist and sociologist Lawrence Joseph Henderson, who took a personal interest in Parsons' career at Harvard. Parsons became part of L. J. Henderson's famous Pareto study group, in which Harvard intellectuals participated, including Crane Brinton, George C. Homans, and Charles P. Curtis. Parsons wrote an article on Pareto's theory and later explained that he had adopted the concept of "social system" from reading Pareto. Parsons also made strong connections with two other influential intellectuals with whom he corresponded for years: economist Frank H. Knight and businessman Chester Barnard. The relationship between Parsons and Sorokin turned sour. A pattern of personal tensions was aggravated by Sorokin's deep dislike for American civilization, which he regarded as a sensate culture that was in decline. Sorokin's writings became increasingly anti-scientistic in his later years, widening the gulf between his work and Parsons' and turning the increasingly positivistic American sociology community against him. Sorokin also tended to belittle all sociology tendencies that differed from his own writings, and by 1934 was quite unpopular at Harvard.

Some of Parsons' students in the department of sociology were Robin Williams Jr., Robert K. Merton, Kingsley Davis, Wilbert Moore, Edward C. Devereux, Logan Wilson, Nicholas Demereth, John Riley Jr., and Mathilda White Riley. Later cohorts of students included Harry Johnson, Bernard Barber, Marion Levy and Jesse R. Pitts. Parsons established, at the students' request, an informal study group which met year after year in Adams' house. Toward the end of Parsons' career, German systems theorist Niklas Luhmann also attended his lectures.

In 1932, Parsons bought a farmhouse near the small town of Acworth, but Parsons often, in his writing, referred to it as "the farmhouse in Alstead". The farmhouse was a very humble structure with almost no modern utilities. Still, it became central to Parsons' life, and many of his most important works were written there.

In the academic year of 1939–1940 Parsons and Schumpeter conducted an informal faculty seminar at Harvard, which discussed the concept of rationality. Among the participants were D. V. McGranahan, Abram Bergson, Wassily Leontief, Gottfried Haberler, and Paul Sweezy. Schumpeter contributed the essay "Rationality in Economics", and Parsons submitted the paper "The Role of Rationality in Social Action" for a general discussion.

=== Neoclassical economics vs. institutionalists ===
In the discussion between neoclassical economics and the institutionalists, which was one of the conflicts that prevailed within the field of economics in the 1920s and early 1930s, Parsons attempted to walk a very fine line. He was very critical about neoclassical theory, an attitude he maintained throughout his life and that is reflected in his critique of Milton Friedman and Gary Becker. He was opposed to the utilitarian bias within the neoclassical approach and could not embrace them fully. However, he agreed partly on their theoretical and methodological style of approach, which should be distinguished from its substance. He was thus unable to accept the institutionalist solution. In a 1975 interview, Parsons recalled a conversation with Schumpeter on the institutionalist methodological position:

An economist like Schumpeter, by contrast, would absolutely have none of that. I remember talking to him about the problem and .. I think Schumpeter was right. If economics had gone that way [like the institutionalists] it would have had to become a primarily empirical discipline, largely descriptive, and without theoretical focus. That's the way the 'institutionalists' went, and of course Mitchell was affiliated with that movement.

=== Anti-Nazism ===
Parsons returned to Germany in the summer of 1930 and became an eyewitness to the feverish atmosphere in Weimar Germany during which the Nazi Party rose to power. Parsons received constant reports about the rise of Nazism through his friend, Edward Y. Hartshorne, who was traveling there. Parsons began, in the late 1930s, to warn the American public about the Nazi threat, but he had little success, as a poll showed that 91 percent of the country opposed the Second World War. One of the first articles that Parsons wrote was "New Dark Age Seen If Nazis Should Win". He was one of the key initiators of the Harvard Defense Committee, aimed at rallying the American public against the Nazis. Parsons' voice sounded again and again over Boston's local radio stations, and he also spoke against Nazism during a dramatic meeting at Harvard, which was disturbed by antiwar activists. Together with graduate student Charles O. Porter, Parsons rallied graduate students at Harvard for the war effort. During the war, Parsons conducted a special study group at Harvard, which analyzed what its members considered the causes of Nazism, and leading experts on that topic participated.

== World War II ==
In the spring of 1941, a discussion group on Japan began to meet at Harvard. The group's five core members were Parsons, John King Fairbank, Edwin O. Reischauer, William M. McGovern, and Marion Levy Jr. A few others occasionally joined the group, including Ai-Li Sung and Edward Y. Hartshorne. The group arose out of a strong desire to understand the country, but, as Levy frankly admitted, "Reischauer was the only one who knew anything about Japan." Parsons, however, was eager to learn more about it and was "concerned with general implications."

In 1942, Parsons worked on arranging a major study of occupied countries with Bartholomew Landheer of the Netherlands Information Office in New York. Parsons motivated Georges Gurvitch, Conrad Arnsber], Safranek and Theodore Fred Abel to participate, but it never materialized for lack of funding. In early 1942, Parsons unsuccessfully approached Hartshorne, who had joined the Psychology Division of the Office of the Coordinator of Information (COI) in Washington to interest his agency in the research project. In February 1943, Parsons became the deputy director of the Harvard School of Overseas Administration, which educated administrators to "run" the occupied territories in Germany and the Pacific Ocean. The task of finding relevant literature on both Europe and Asia was mindboggling and occupied a fair amount of Parsons' time. One scholar Parsons came to know was Karl August Wittfogel and they discussed Weber. On China, Parsons received fundamental information from Chinese scholar Ai-Li Sung Chin and her husband, Robert Chin. Another Chinese scholar Parsons worked closely with in this period was Hsiao-Tung Fei (or Fei Xiaotong), who had studied at the London School of Economics and was an expert on the social structure of the Chinese village.

=== Intellectual exchanges ===
Parsons met Alfred Schütz during the rationality seminar, which he conducted together with Schumpeter, at Harvard in the spring of 1940. Schütz had been close to Edmund Husserl and was deeply embedded in the latter's phenomenological philosophy. Schütz was born in Vienna but moved to the US in 1939, and for years, he worked on the project of developing a phenomenological sociology, primarily based on an attempt to find some point between Husserl's method and Weber's sociology. Parsons had asked Schütz to give a presentation at the rationality seminar, which he did on April 13, 1940, and Parsons and Schütz had lunch together afterward. Schütz was fascinated with Parsons' theory, which he regarded as the state-of-the-art social theory, and wrote an evaluation of Parsons' theory that he kindly asked Parsons to comment. That led to a short but intensive correspondence, which generally revealed that the gap between Schütz's sociologized phenomenology and Parsons' concept of voluntaristic action was far too great. From Parsons' point of view, Schütz's position was too speculative and subjectivist, and tended to reduce social processes to the articulation of a Lebenswelt consciousness. For Parsons, the defining edge of human life was action as a catalyst for historical change, and it was essential for sociology, as a science, to pay strong attention to the subjective element of action, but it should never become completely absorbed in it since the purpose of a science was to explain causal relationships, by covering laws or by other types of explanatory devices. Schütz's basic argument was that sociology cannot ground itself and that epistemology was not a luxury but a necessity for the social scientist. Parsons agreed but stressed the pragmatic need to demarcate science and philosophy and insisted moreover that the grounding of a conceptual scheme for empirical theory construction cannot aim at absolute solutions but needs to take a sensible stock-taking of the epistemological balance at each point in time. However, the two men shared many basic assumptions about the nature of social theory, which has kept the debate simmering ever since. By request from Ilse Schütz, after her husband's death, Parsons gave permission to publish the correspondence between him and Schütz. Parsons also wrote "A 1974 Retrospective Perspective" to the correspondence, which characterized his position as a "Kantian point of view" and found that Schütz's strong dependence on Husserl's "phenomenological reduction" would make it very difficult to reach the kind of "conceptual scheme" that Parsons found essential for theory-building in social sciences.

Between 1940 and 1944, Parsons and Eric Voegelin exchanged intellectual views through correspondence. Parsons had probably met Voegelin in 1938 and 1939, when Voegelin held a temporary instructor appointment at Harvard. The bouncing point for their conversation was Parsons' manuscript on anti-Semitism and other materials that he had sent to Voegelin. Discussion touched on the nature of capitalism, the rise of the West, and the origin of Nazism. The key to the discussion was the implication of Weber's interpretation of Protestant ethics and the impact of Calvinism on modern history. Although the two scholars agreed on many fundamental characteristics about Calvinism, their understanding of its historical impact was quite different. Generally, Voegelin regarded Calvinism as essentially a dangerous totalitarian ideology; Parsons argued that its current features were temporary and that the functional implications of its long-term, emerging value-l system had revolutionary and not only "negative" impact on the general rise of the institutions of modernity.

The two scholars also discussed Parsons' debate with Schütz and especially why Parsons had ended his encounter with Schutz. Parsons found that Schutz, rather than attempting to build social science theory, tended to get consumed in philosophical detours. Parsons wrote to Voegelin: "Possibly one of my troubles in my discussion with Schuetz lies in the fact that by cultural heritage I am a Calvinist. I do not want to be a philosopher – I shy away from the philosophical problems underlying my scientific work. By the same token I don't think he wants to be a scientist as I understand the term until he has settled all the underlying philosophical difficulties. If the physicists of the 17th century had been Schuetzes there might well have been no Newtonian system."

In 1942, Stuart C. Dodd published a major work, Dimensions of Society, which attempted to build a general theory of society on the foundation of a mathematical and quantitative systematization of social sciences. Dodd advanced a particular approach, known as an "S-theory". Parsons discussed Dodd's theoretical outline in a review article the same year. Parsons acknowledged Dodd's contribution to be an exceedingly formidable work but argued against its premises as a general paradigm for the social sciences. Parsons generally argued that Dodd's "S-theory", which included the so-called "social distance" scheme of Bogardus, was unable to construct a sufficiently sensitive and systematized theoretical matrix, compared with the "traditional" approach, which has developed around the lines of Weber, Pareto, Émile Durkheim, Sigmund Freud, William Isaac Thomas, and other important agents of an action-system approach with a clearer dialogue with the cultural and motivational dimensions of human interaction.

In April 1944, Parsons participated in a conference, "On Germany after the War", of psychoanalytical oriented psychiatrists and a few social scientists to analyze the causes of Nazism and to discuss the principles for the coming occupation.

During the conference, Parsons opposed what he found to be Lawrence Kubie's reductionism. Kubie was a psychoanalyst, who strongly argued that the German national character was completely "destructive" and that it would be necessary for a special agency of the United Nations to control the German educational system directly. Parsons and many others at the conference were strongly opposed to Kubie's idea. Parsons argued that it would fail and suggested that Kubie was viewing the question of Germans' reorientation "too exclusively in psychiatric terms". Parsons was also against the extremely harsh Morgenthau Plan, published in September 1944. After the conference, Parsons wrote an article, "The Problem of Controlled Institutional Change", against the plan.

Parsons participated as a part-time adviser to the Foreign Economic Administration Agency between March and October 1945 to discuss postwar reparations and deindustrialization.

Parsons was elected a Fellow of the American Academy of Arts and Sciences in 1945.

=== Taking charge at Harvard ===
Parsons' situation at Harvard University changed significantly in early 1944, when he received a good offer from Northwestern University. Harvard reacted to the offer by appointing Parsons as the chairman of the department, promoting him to the rank of full professor and accepting the process of reorganization, which led to the establishment of the new department of Social Relations. Parsons' letter to Dean Paul Herman Buck, on April 3, 1944, reveals the high point of this moment. Because of the new development at Harvard, Parsons chose to decline an offer from William Langer to join the Office of Strategic Services, the predecessor of the Central Intelligence Agency. Langer proposed for Parsons to follow the American army in its march into Germany and to function as a political adviser to the administration of the occupied territories. Late in 1944, under the auspices of the Cambridge Community Council, Parsons directed a project together with Elizabeth Schlesinger. They investigated ethnic and racial tensions in the Boston area between students from Radcliffe College and Wellesley College. This study was a reaction to an upsurge of anti-Semitism in the Boston area, which began in late 1943 and continued into 1944. At the end of November 1946, the Social Research Council (SSRC) asked Parsons to write a comprehensive report of the topic of how the social sciences could contribute to the understanding of the modern world. The background was a controversy over whether the social sciences should be incorporated into the National Science Foundation.

Parsons' report was in form of a large memorandum, "Social Science: A Basic National Resource", which became publicly available in July 1948 and remains a powerful historical statement about how he saw the role of modern social sciences.

== Postwar ==
=== Russian Research Center ===
Parsons became a member of the executive committee of the new Russian Research Center at Harvard in 1948, which had Parsons' close friend and colleague, Clyde Kluckhohn, as its director. Parsons went to Allied-occupied Germany in the summer of 1948, was a contact person for the RRC, and was interested in the Russian refugees who were stranded in Germany. He happened to interview in Germany a few members of the Vlasov Army, a Russian Liberation Army that had collaborated with the Germans during the war. The movement was named after Andrey Vlasov, a Soviet general captured by the Germans in June 1942. The Vlasov movement's ideology was a hybrid of elements and has been called "communism without Stalin", but in the Prague Manifesto (1944), it had moved toward the framework of a constitutional liberal state.

In Germany in the summer of 1948 Parsons wrote several letters to Kluckhohn to report on his investigations.

=== Anticommunism ===
Parsons' fight against communism was a natural extension of his fight against fascism in the 1930s and the 1940s. For Parsons, communism and fascism were two aspects of the same problem; his article "A Tentative Outline of American Values", published posthumously in 1989, called both collectivistic types "empirical finalism", which he believed was a secular "mirror" of religious types of "salvationalism". In contrast, Parsons highlighted that American values generally were based on the principle of "instrumental activism", which he believed was the outcome of Puritanism as a historical process. It represented what Parsons called "worldly asceticism" and represented the absolute opposite of empirical finalism. One can thus understand Parsons' statement late in life that the greatest threat to humanity is every type of "fundamentalism". By the term empirical finalism, he implied the type of claim assessed by cultural and ideological actors about the correct or "final" ends of particular patterns of value orientation in the actual historical world (such as the notion of "a truly just society"), which was absolutist and "indisputable" in its manner of declaration and in its function as a belief system. A typical example would be the Jacobins' behavior during the French Revolution. Parsons' rejection of communist and fascist totalitarianism was theoretically and intellectually an integral part of his theory of world history, and he tended to regard the European Reformation as the most crucial event in "modern" world history. Like Weber, he tended to highlight the crucial impact of Calvinist religiosity in the socio-political and socio-economic processes that followed. He maintained it reached its most radical form in England in the 17th century and in effect gave birth to the special cultural mode that has characterized the American value system and history ever since. The Calvinist faith system, authoritarian in the beginning, eventually released in its accidental long-term institutional effects a fundamental democratic revolution in the world. Parsons maintained that the revolution was steadily unfolding, as part of an interpenetration of Puritan values in the world at large.

=== American exceptionalism ===
Parsons defended American exceptionalism and argued that, because of a variety of historical circumstances, the impact of the Reformation had reached a certain intensity in British history. Puritan, essentially Calvinist, value patterns had become institutionalized in Britain's internal situation. The outcome was that Puritan radicalism was reflected in the religious radicalism of the Puritan sects, in the poetry of John Milton, in the English Civil War, and in the process leading to the Glorious Revolution of 1688. It was the radical fling of the Puritan Revolution that provided settlers in early 17th-century Colonial America, and the Puritans who settled in America represented radical views on individuality, egalitarianism, skepticism toward state power, and the zeal of the religious calling. The settlers established something unique in the world that was under the religious zeal of Calvinist values.

Therefore, a new kind of nation was born, the character of which became clear by the time of the American Revolution and in the U.S. Constitution, and its dynamics were later studied by Alexis de Tocqueville. The French Revolution was a failed attempt to copy the American model. Although America has changed in its social composition since 1787, Parsons maintained that it preserves the basic revolutionary Calvinist value pattern. That has been further revealed in the pluralist and highly individualized America, with its thick, network-oriented civil society, which is of crucial importance to its success and these factors have provided it with its historical lead in the process of industrialization.

Parsons maintained that this has continued to place it in the leading position in the world, but as a historical process and not in "the nature of things". Parsons viewed the "highly special feature of the modern Western social world" as "dependent on the peculiar circumstances of its history, and not the necessary universal result of social development as a whole".

=== Defender of modernity ===
In contrast to some "radicals", Parsons was a defender of modernity. He believed that modern civilization, with its technology and its constantly evolving institutions, was ultimately strong, vibrant, and essentially progressive. He acknowledged that the future had no inherent guarantees, but as sociologists Robert Holton and Bryan Turner said that Parsons was not nostalgic and that he did not believe in the past as a lost "golden age" but that he maintained that modernity generally had improved conditions, admittedly often in troublesome and painful ways but usually positively. He had faith in humanity's potential but not naïvely. When asked at the Brown Seminary in 1973 if he was optimistic about the future, he answered, "Oh, I think I'm basically optimistic about the human prospects in the long run." Parsons pointed out that he had been a student at Heidelberg at the height of the vogue of Oswald Spengler, author of The Decline of the West, "and he didn't give the West more than 50 years of continuing vitality after the time he wrote.... Well, its more than 50 years later now, and I don't think the West has just simply declined. He was wrong in thinking it was the end."

=== Harvard Department of Social Relations ===
At Harvard, Parsons was instrumental in forming the Department of Social Relations, an interdisciplinary venture among sociology, anthropology, and psychology. The new department was officially created in January 1946 with him as the chairman and with prominent figures at the faculty, such as Stouffer, Kluckhohn, Henry Murray and Gordon Allport. An appointment for Hartshorne was considered but he was killed in Germany by an unknown gunman as he was driving on the highway. His position went instead to George C. Homans. The new department was galvanized by Parsons' idea of creating a theoretical and institutional base for a unified social science. Parsons also became strongly interested in systems theory and cybernetics and began to adopt their basic ideas and concepts to the realm of social science, giving special attention to the work of Norbert Wiener.

Some of the students who arrived at the Department of Social Relations in the years after the Second World War were David Aberle, Gardner Lindzey, Harold Garfinkel, David G. Hays, Benton Johnson, Marian Johnson, Kaspar Naegele, James Olds, Albert Cohen, Norman Birnbaum, Robin Murphy Williams, Jackson Toby, Robert N. Bellah, Joseph Kahl, Joseph Berger, Morris Zelditch, Renée Fox, Tom O'Dea, Ezra Vogel, Clifford Geertz, Joseph Elder, Theodore Mills, Mark Field, Edward Laumann, and Francis Sutton.

Renée Fox, who arrived at Harvard in 1949, would become a very close friend of the Parsons family. Joseph Berger, who also arrived at Harvard in 1949 after finishing his BA from Brooklyn College, would become Parsons' research assistant from 1952 to 1953 and would get involved in his research projects with Robert F. Bales.

According to Parsons' own account, it was during his conversations with Elton Mayo that he realized it was necessary for him to take a serious look at the work of Freud. In the fall of 1938, Parsons began to offer a series of non-credit evening courses on Freud. As time passed, Parsons developed a strong interest in psychoanalysis. He volunteered to participate in nontherapeutic training at the Boston Psychoanalytic Institute, where he began a didactic analysis with Grete Bibring in September 1946. Insight into psychoanalysis is significantly reflected in his later work, especially reflected in The Social System and his general writing on psychological issues and on the theory of socialization. That influence was also to some extent apparent in his empirical analysis of fascism during the war. Wolfgang Köhler's study of the mentality of apes and Kurt Koffka's ideas of Gestalt psychology also received Parsons' attention.

=== The Social System and Toward a General Theory of Action ===
During the late 1940s and the early 1950s, he worked very hard on producing some major theoretical statements. In 1951, Parsons published two major theoretical works, The Social System and Toward a General Theory of Action. The latter work, which was coauthored with Edward Tolman, Edward Shils and several others, was the outcome of the so-called Carnegie Seminar at Harvard University, which had taken place in the period of September 1949 and January 1950. The former work was Parsons' first major attempt to present his basic outline of a general theory of society since The Structure of Social Action (1937). He discusses the basic methodological and metatheoretical principles for such a theory. He attempts to present a general social system theory that is built systematically from most basic premises and so he featured the idea of an interaction situation based on need-dispositions and facilitated through the basic concepts of cognitive, cathectic, and evaluative orientation. The work also became known for introducing his famous pattern variables, which in reality represented choices distributed along a Gemeinschaft vs. Gesellschaft axis.

The details of Parsons' thought about the outline of the social system went through a rapid series of changes in the following years, but the basics remained. During the early 1950s, the idea of the AGIL model took place in Parsons's mind gradually. According to Parsons, its key idea was sparked during his work with Bales on motivational processes in small groups.

Parsons carried the idea into the major work that he co-authored with a student, Neil Smelser, which was published in 1956 as Economy and Society. Within this work, the first rudimentary model of the AGIL scheme was presented. It reorganized the basic concepts of the pattern variables in a new way and presented the solution within a system-theoretical approach by using the idea of a cybernetic hierarchy as an organizing principle. The real innovation in the model was the concept of the "latent function" or the pattern maintenance function, which became the crucial key to the whole cybernetic hierarchy.

During its theoretical development, Parsons showed a persistent interest in symbolism. An important statement is Parsons' "The Theory of Symbolism in Relation to Action". The article was stimulated by a series of informal discussion group meetings, which Parsons and several other colleagues in the spring of 1951 had conducted with philosopher and semiotician Charles W. Morris. His interest in symbolism went hand in hand with his interest in Freud's theory and "The Superego and the Theory of Social Systems", written in May 1951 for a meeting of the American Psychiatric Association. The paper can be regarded as the main statement of his own interpretation of Freud, but also as a statement of how Parsons tried to use Freud's pattern of symbolization to structure the theory of social system and eventually to codify the cybernetic hierarchy of the AGIL system within the parameter of a system of symbolic differentiation. His discussion of Freud also contains several layers of criticism that reveal that Parsons' use of Freud was selective rather than orthodox. In particular, he claimed that Freud had "introduced an unreal separation between the superego and the ego".

=== Subscriber to systems theory ===
Parsons was an early subscriber to systems theory. He had early been fascinated by the writings of Walter B. Cannon and his concept of homeostasis as well as the writings of French physiologist Claude Bernard. His interest in systems theory had been further stimulated by his contract with L.J. Henderson. Parsons called the concept of "system" for an indispensable master concept in the work of building theoretical paradigms for social sciences. From 1952 to 1957, Parsons participated in an ongoing Conference on System Theory under the chairmanship of Roy R. Grinker, Sr., in Chicago.

Parsons came into contact with several prominent intellectuals of the time and was particularly impressed by the ideas of social insect biologist Alfred Emerson. Parsons was especially compelled by Emerson's idea that, in the sociocultural world, the functional equivalent of the gene was that of the "symbol". Parsons also participated in two of the meetings of the famous Macy Conferences on systems theory and on issues that are now classified as cognitive science, which took place in New York from 1946 to 1953 and included scientists like John von Neumann. Parsons read widely on systems theory at the time, especially works of Norbert Wiener and William Ross Ashby, who were also among the core participants in the conferences. Around the same time, Parsons also benefited from conversations with political scientist Karl Deutsch on systems theory. In one conference, the Fourth Conference of the problems of consciousness in March 1953 at Princeton and sponsored by the Macy Foundation, Parsons would give a presentation on "Conscious and Symbolic Processes" and embark on an intensive group discussion which included exchange with child psychologist Jean Piaget.

Among the other participants were Mary A.B. Brazier, Frieda Fromm-Reichmann, Nathaniel Kleitman, Margaret Mead and Gregory Zilboorg. Parsons would defend the thesis that consciousness is essentially a social action phenomenon, not primarily a "biological" one. During the conference, Parsons criticized Piaget for not sufficiently separating cultural factors from a physiologistic concept of "energy".

=== McCarthy era ===
During the McCarthy era, on April 1, 1952, J. Edgar Hoover, the director of the Federal Bureau of Investigation, received a personal letter from an informant who reported on communist activities at Harvard. During a later interview, the informant claimed that "Parsons... was probably the leader of an inner group" of communist sympathizers at Harvard. The informant reported that the old department under Sorokin had been conservative and had "loyal Americans of good character" but that the new Department of Social Relations had turned into a decisive left-wing place as a result of "Parsons's manipulations and machinations".

On October 27, 1952, Hoover authorized the Boston FBI to initiate a security-type investigation of Parsons. In February 1954, a colleague, Samuel Stouffer, wrote to Parsons in England to inform him that Stouffer had been denied access to classified documents and that part of the stated reason was that Stouffer knew communists, including Parsons, "who was a member of the Communist Party".

Parsons immediately wrote an affidavit in defense of Stouffer, and he also defended himself against the charges that were in the affidavit: "This allegation is so preposterous that I cannot understand how any reasonable person could come to the conclusion that I was a member of the Communist Party or ever had been." In a personal letter to Stouffer, Parsons wrote, "I will fight for you against this evil with everything there is in me: I am in it with you to the death." The charges against Parsons resulted in Parsons being unable to participate in a UNESCO conference, and it was not until January 1955 that he was acquitted of the charges.

=== Family, Socialization and Interaction Process ===
Since the late 1930s, Parsons had continued to show great interest in psychology and in psychoanalysis. In the academic year of 1955–1956, he taught a seminar at Boston Psychoanalytic Society and Institute entitled "Sociology and Psychoanalysis". In 1956, he published a major work, Family, Socialization and Interaction Process, which explored the way in which psychology and psychoanalysis bounce into the theories of motivation and socialization, as well into the question of kinship, which for Parsons established the fundamental axis for that subsystem he later would call "the social community".

It contained articles written by Parsons and articles written in collaboration with Robert F. Bales, James Olds, Morris Zelditch Jr., and Philip E. Slater. The work included a theory of personality as well as studies of role differentiation. The strongest intellectual stimulus that Parsons most likely got then was from brain researcher James Olds, one of the founders of neuroscience and whose 1955 book on learning and motivation was strongly influenced from his conversations with Parsons. Some of the ideas in the book had been submitted by Parsons in an intellectual brainstorm in an informal "work group" which he had organized with Joseph Berger, William Caudill, Frank E. Jones, Kaspar D. Naegele, Theodore M. Mills, Bengt G. Rundblad, and others. Albert J. Reiss from Vanderbilt University had submitted his critical commentary.

In the mid-1950s, Parsons also had extensive discussions with Olds about the motivational structure of psychosomatic problems, and at this time Parsons' concept of psychosomatic problems was strongly influenced by readings and direct conversations with Franz Alexander (a psychoanalyst, originally associated with the Berlin Psychoanalytic Institute, who was a pioneer of psychosomatic medicine), Grinker and John Spiegel.

In 1955, François Bourricaud was preparing a reader of some of Parsons' work for a French audience, and Parsons wrote a preface for the book Au lecteur français (To the French Reader); it also went over Bourricaud's introduction very carefully. In his correspondence with Bourricaud, Parsons insisted that he did not necessarily treat values as the only, let alone "the primary empirical reference point" of the action system since so many other factors were also involved in the actual historical pattern of an action situation.

=== Center of Advanced Study in the Behavioral Sciences ===
Parsons spent 1957 to 1958 at the Center of Advanced Study in the Behavioral Sciences in Palo Alto, California, where he met for the first time Kenneth Burke; Burke's flamboyant, explosive temperament made a great impression on Parsons, and the two men became close friends. Parsons explained in a letter the impression Burke had left on him: "The big thing to me is that Burke more than anyone else has helped me to fill a major gap in my own theoretical interests, in the field of the analysis of expressive symbolism."

Another scholar whom Parsons met at the Center of Advanced Studies in the Behavioral Sciences at Palo Alto was Alfred L. Kroeber, the "dean of American anthropologists". Kroeber, who had received his PhD at Columbia and who had worked with the Arapaho Indians, was about 81 when Parsons met him. Parsons had the greatest admiration for Kroeber and called him "my favorite elder statesman".

In Palo Alto, Kroeber suggested to Parsons that they write a joint statement to clarify the distinction between cultural and social systems, then the subject of endless debates. In October 1958, Parsons and Kroeber published their joint statement in a short article, "The Concept of Culture and the Social System", which became highly influential. Parsons and Kroeber declared that it is important both to keep a clear distinction between the two concepts and to avoid a methodology by which either would be reduced to the other.

== Later career ==
=== Public conferences ===
In 1955 to 1956, a group of faculty members at Cornell University met regularly and discussed Parsons' writings. The next academic year, a series of seven widely attended public seminars followed and culminated in a session at which he answered his critics. The discussions in the seminars were summed up in a book edited by Max Black, The Social Theories of Talcott Parsons: A Critical Examination. It included an essay by Parsons, "The Point of View of the Author". The scholars included in the volume were Edward C. Devereux Jr., Robin M. Williams Jr., Chandler Morse, Alfred L. Baldwin, Urie Bronfenbrenner, Henry A. Landsberger, William Foote Whyte, Black, and Andrew Hacker. The contributions converted many angles including personality theory, organizational theory, and various methodological discussions. Parsons' essay is particularly notable because it and another essay, "Pattern Variables Revisited", both represented the most full-scale accounts of the basic elements of his theoretical strategy and the general principles behind his approach to theory-building when they were published in 1960.

One essay also included, in metatheoretical terms, a criticism of the theoretical foundations for so-called conflict theory.

=== Criticism of theories ===
From the late 1950s to the student rebellion in the 1960s and its aftermath, Parsons' theory was criticized by some scholars and intellectuals of the left, who claimed that Parsons's theory was inherently conservative, if not reactionary. Alvin Gouldner even claimed that Parsons had been an opponent of the New Deal. Parsons' theory was further regarded as unable to reflect social change, human suffering, poverty, deprivation, and conflict. Theda Skocpol thought that the apartheid system in South Africa was the ultimate proof that Parsons's theory was "wrong".

At the same time, Parsons' idea of the individual was seen as "oversocialized", "repressive", or subjugated in normative "conformity". In addition, Jürgen Habermas and countless others were of the belief that Parsons' system theory and his action theory were inherently opposed and mutually hostile and that his system theory was especially "mechanical", "positivistic", "anti-individualistic", "anti-voluntaristic", and "de-humanizing" by the sheer nature of its intrinsic theoretical context.

By the same token, his evolutionary theory was regarded as "uni-linear", "mechanical", "biologistic", an ode to world system status quo, or simply an ill-concealed instruction manual for "the capitalist nation-state". The first manifestations of that branch of criticism would be intellectuals like Lewis Coser, Ralf Dahrendorf, David Lockwood, John Rex, C. Wright Mills, Tom Bottomore and Gouldner.

=== Democratic Party supporter ===
Parsons supported John F. Kennedy on November 8, 1960; from 1923, with one exception, Parsons voted for Democrats all his life. He discussed the Kennedy election widely in his correspondence at the time. Parsons was especially interested in the symbolic implications involved in the fact of Kennedy's Catholic background for the implications for the United States as an integral community (it was the first time that a Catholic had become President of the United States).

In a letter to Robert N. Bellah, he wrote, "I am sure you have been greatly intrigued by the involvement of the religious issue in our election." Parsons, who described himself as a "Stevenson Democrat", was especially enthusiastic that his favored politician, Adlai Stevenson II, had been appointed United States Ambassador to the United Nations. Parsons had supported Stevenson in 1952 and 1956 and was greatly disappointed that Stevenson lost heavily both times.

=== Modernization theory influence ===
In the early 1960s, it became obvious that his ideas had a great impact on much of the theories of modernization at the time. His influence was very extensive but at the same time, the concrete adoption of his theory was often quite selective, half-hearted, superficial, and eventually confused. Many modernization theorists never used the full power of Parsons' theory but concentrated on some formalist formula, which often was taken out of the context that had the deeper meaning with which Parsons originally introduced them.

In works by Gabriel A. Almond and James S. Coleman, Karl W. Deutsch, S. N. Eisenstadt, Seymour Martin Lipset, Samuel P. Huntington, David E. Apter, Lucian W. Pye, Sidney Verba, and Chalmers Johnson, and others, Parsons' influence is clear. Indeed, it was the intensive influence of Parsons' ideas in political sociology that originally got scholar William Buxton interested in his work. In addition, David Easton would claim that in the history of political science, the two scholars who had made any serious attempt to construct a general theory for political science on the issue of political support were Easton and Parsons.

=== Interest in religion ===
One of the scholars with whom he corresponded extensively with during his lifetime and whose opinion he highly valued was Robert N. Bellah. Parsons's discussion with Bellah would cover a wide range of topics, including the theology of Paul Tillich. The correspondence would continue when Bellah, in the early fall of 1960, went to Japan to study Japanese religion and ideology. In August 1960, Parsons sent Bellah a draft of his paper on "The Religious Background of the American Value System" to ask for his commentary.

In a letter to Bellah of September 30, 1960, Parsons discussed his reading of Perry Miller's Errand into the Wilderness. Parsons wrote that Miller's discussion of the role of Calvinism "in the early New England theology... is a first rate and fit beautifully with the broad position I have taken." Miller was a literary Harvard historian whose books such as The New England Mind established new standards for the writing of American cultural and religious history. Miller remained one of Parsons' most favoured historians throughout his life. Indeed, religion had always a special place in Parsons' heart, but his son, in an interview, maintained that he that his father was probably not really "religious."

Throughout his life, Parsons interacted with a broad range of intellectuals and others who took a deep interest in religious belief systems, doctrines, and institutions. One notable person who interacted with Parsons was Marie Augusta Neal, a nun of the Sisters of Notre Dame de Namur who sent Parsons a huge number of her manuscripts and invited him to conferences and intellectual events in her Catholic Church. Neal received her PhD from Harvard under Parsons's supervision in 1963, and she would eventually become professor and then chair of sociology at Emmanuel College.

=== Criticism of Riesman ===
Parsons and Winston White cowrote an article, "The Link Between Character and Society", which was published in 1961. It was a critical discussion of David Riesman's The Lonely Crowd, which had been published a decade earlier and had turned into an unexpected bestseller, reaching 1 million sold copies in 1977. Riesman was a prominent member of the American academic left, influenced by Erich Fromm and the Frankfurt School. In reality, Riesman's book was an academic attempt to give credit to the concept of "mass society" and especially to the idea of an America suffocated in social conformity. Riesman had essentially argued that at the emerging of highly advanced capitalism, the America basic value system and its socializing roles had changed from an "inner-directed" toward an "other-directed" pattern of value-orientation.

Parsons and White challenged Riesman's idea and argued that there had been no change away from an inner-directed personality structure. The said that Riesman's "other-directness" looked like a caricature of Charles Cooley's looking-glass self, and they argued that the framework of "institutional individualism" as the basic code-structure of America's normative system had essentially not changed. What had happened, however, was that the industrialized process and its increased pattern of societal differentiation had changed the family's generalized symbolic function in society and had allowed for a greater permissiveness in the way the child related to its parents. Parsons and White argued that was not the prelude to greater "otherdirectness" but a more complicated way by which inner-directed pattern situated itself in the social environment.

=== Political power and social influence ===
1963 was a notable year in Parsons's theoretical development because it was the year when he published two important articles: one on political power and one on the concept of social influence. The two articles represented Parsons's first published attempt to work out the idea of Generalized Symbolic Media as an integral part of the exchange processes within the AGIL system. It was a theoretical development, which Parsons had worked on ever since the publication of Economy and Society (1956).

The prime model for the generalized symbolic media was money and Parsons was reflecting on the question whether the functional characteristics of money represented an exclusive uniqueness of the economic system or whether it was possible to identify other generalized symbolic media in other subsystems as well. Although each medium had unique characteristics, Parsons claimed that power (for the political system) and influence (for the societal community) had institutional functions, which essentially was structurally similar to the general systemic function of money. Using Roman Jakobson's idea of "code" and "message", Parsons divided the components of the media into a question of value-principle versus coordination standards for the "code-structure" and the question of factor versus product control within those social process which carried the "message" components. While "utility" could be regarded as the value-principle for the economy (medium: money), "effectiveness" was the value-principle for the political system (by political power) and social solidarity for the societal community (by social influence). Parsons would eventually choose the concept of value-commitment as the generalized symbolic medium for the fiduciary system with integrity as the value principle.

=== Contacts with other scholars ===
In August 1963, Parsons got a new research assistant, Victor Lidz, who would become an important collaborator and colleague. In 1964, Parsons flew to Heidelberg to celebrate the 100th birthday of Weber and discuss Weber's work with Habermas, Herbert Marcuse, and others. Parsons delivered his paper "Evaluation and Objectivity in Social Science: An Interpretation of Max Weber's Contribution". The meeting became mostly a clash between pro-Weberian scholars and the Frankfurt School. Before leaving for Germany, Parsons discussed the upcoming meeting with Reinhard Bendix and commented, "I am afraid I will be something of a Daniel in the Lion's den." Bendix wrote back and told Parsons that Marcuse sounded very much like Christoph Steding, a Nazi philosopher.

Parsons conducted a persistent correspondence with noted scholar Benjamin Nelson, and they shared a common interest in the rise and the destiny of civilizations until Nelson's death in 1977. The two scholars also shared a common enthusiasm for the work of Weber and would generally agree on the main interpretative approach to the study of Weber. Nelson had participated in the Weber Centennial in Heidelberg.

=== Opposition to the Frankfurt School ===
Nelson got into a violent argument with Herbert Marcuse and accused him of tarnishing Weber. In reading the written version of Nelson's contribution to the Weber Centennial, Parsons wrote, "I cannot let the occasion pass without a word of congratulations which is strong enough so that if it were concert I should shout bravo." In several letters, Nelson would keep Parsons informed of the often-turbulent leftist environment of Marcuse. In the letter of September 1967, Nelson would tell Parsons how much he enjoyed reading Parsons' essay on Kinship and The Associational Aspect of Social Structure. Also, one of the scholars on whose work Parsons and Nelson would share internal commentaries was Habermas.

=== Ethnicity, kinship, and diffuse solidarity ===
Parsons had for years corresponded with his former graduate student David M. Schneider, who had taught at the University of California Berkeley until the latter, in 1960, accepted a position as professor in anthropology at the University of Chicago. Schneider had received his PhD at Harvard in social anthropology in 1949 and had become a leading expert on the American kinship system. Schneider, in 1968, published American Kinship: A Cultural Account which became a classic in the field, and he had sent Parsons a copy of the copyedited manuscript before its publication. Parsons was highly appreciative of Schneider's work, which became in many ways a crucial turning point in his own attempt to understand the fundamental elements of the American kinship system, a key to understanding the factor of ethnicity and especially building the theoretical foundation of his concept of the societal community, which, by the beginning of the early 1970s, had become a strong priority in the number of theoretical projects of his own intellectual life.

Parsons borrowed the term "diffuse enduring solidarity" from Schneider, as a major concept for his own considerations on the theoretical construction of the concept of the societal community. In the spring of 1968, Parsons and Schneider had discussed Clifford Geertz's article on religion as a cultural system on which Parsons wrote a review. Parsons, who was a close friend of Geertz, was puzzled over Geertz's article. In a letter to Schneider, Parsons spoke about "the rather sharp strictures on what he [Geertz] calls the extremely narrow intellectual tradition with special reference to Weber, but also to Durkheim. My basic point is in this respect, he greatly overstated his case seeming to argue that this intellectual tradition was by now irrelevant."

Schneider wrote back to Parsons, "So much, so often, as I read Cliff's stuff I cannot get a clear consistent picture of just what the religious system consist in instead only how it is said to work."

In a letter of July 1968 to Gene Tanke of the University of California Press, Parsons offered a critical note on the state of psychoanalytical theory and wrote: "The use of psychoanalytical theory in interpretation of social and historical subject matter is somewhat hazardous enterprise, and a good deal of nonsense has been written in the name of such attempts." Around 1969, Parsons was approached by the prestigious Encyclopedia of the History of Idea about writing an entry in the encyclopedia on the topic of the "Sociology of Knowledge". Parsons accepted and wrote one of his most powerful essays, "The Sociology of Knowledge and the History of Ideas", in 1969 or 1970. Parsons discussed how the sociology of knowledge, as a modern intellectual discipline, had emerged from the dynamics of European intellectual history and had reached a kind of cutting point in the philosophy of Kant and further explored by Hegel but reached its first "classical" formulation in the writing of Mannheim, whose brilliance Parsons acknowledged but disagreed with his German historicism for its antipositivistic epistemology; that was largely rejected in the more positivistic world of American social science. For various reasons, the editors of the encyclopedia turned down Parsons' essay, which did not fit the general format of their volume. The essay was not published until 2006.

Parsons had several conversations with Daniel Bell on a "post-industrial society", some of which were conducted over lunch at William James Hall. After reading an early version of Bell's magnum opus, The Coming of the Post-Industrial Society, Parsons wrote a letter to Bell, dated November 30, 1971, to offer his criticism. Among his many critical points, Parsons stressed especially that Bell's discussion of technology tended to "separate off culture" and treat the two categories "as what I would call culture minus the cognitive component".

Parsons' interest in the role of ethnicity and religion in the genesis of social solidarity within the local community heavily influenced another of his early 1960s graduate students, Edward Laumann. As a student, Laumann was interested in the role of social network structure in shaping community-level solidarity. Combining Parsons' interest in the role of ethnicity in shaping local community solidarity with W. Lloyd Warner's structural approach to social class, Laumann argued that ethnicity, religion, and perceived social class all play a large role in structuring community social networks. Laumann's work found that community networks are highly partitioned along lines of ethnicity, religion, and occupational social status. It also highlighted the tension individuals experience between their preference to associate with people who are like them (homophily) and their simultaneous desire to affiliate with higher-status others. Later, at the beginning of his career at the University of Chicago, Laumann would argue that how the impulses are resolved by individuals forms the basis of corporate or competitive class consciousness within a given community. In addition to demonstrating how community solidarity can be conceptualized as a social network and the role of ethnicity, religion, and class in shaping such networks, Laumann's dissertation became one of the first examples of the use of population-based surveys in the collection of social network data, and thus a precursor to decades of egocentric social network analysis. Parsons thus played an important role in shaping the early interest of social network analysis in homophily and the use of egocentric network data to assess group- and community-level social network structures.

=== Systems theory on biological and social systems ===
In his later years, Parsons became increasingly interested in working out the higher conceptual parameters of the human condition, which was in part what led him toward rethinking questions of cultural and social evolution and the "nature" of telic systems, the latter which he especially discussed with Bellah, Lidz, Fox, Willy de Craemer, and others. Parsons became increasingly interested in clarifying the relationship between biological and social theory. Parsons was the initiator of the first Daedalus conference on "Some Relations between Biological and Social Theory", sponsored by the American Academy of Arts and Sciences. Parsons wrote a memorandum dated September 16, 1971, in which he spelled out the intellectual framework for the conference. As Parsons explained in the memo, the basic goal of the conference was to establish a conceptual fundament for a theory of living systems. The first conference was held on January 7, 1972. Among the participants beside Parsons and Lidz were Ernst Mayr, Seymour Kety, Gerald Holton, A. Hunter Dupree, and William K. Wimsatt. A second Daedalus Conference on Living Systems was held on March 1–2, 1974 and included Edward O. Wilson, who was about to publish his famous work on sociobiology. Other new participants were John T. Bonner, Karl H. Pribram, Eric Lennenberg, and Stephen J. Gould.

=== Sociology of law ===
Parsons began in the fall of 1972 to conduct a seminar on "Law and Sociology" with legal philosopher Lon L. Fuller, well known for his book The Morality of Law (1964). The seminar and conversations with Fuller stimulated Parsons to write one of his most influential articles, "Law as an Intellectual Stepchild". Parsons discuses Roberto Mangabeira Unger's Law in Modern Society (1976). Another indication of Parsons' interest in law was reflected in his students, such as John Akula, who wrote his dissertation in sociology, Law and the Development of Citizenship (1973). In September 1972, Parsons participated in a conference in Salzburg on "The Social Consequences of Modernization in Socialist Countries". Among the other participants were Alex Inkeles, Ezra Vogel, and Ralf Dahrendorf.

=== Criticism of Bendix ===
In 1972, Parsons wrote two review articles to discuss the work of Bendix, which provide a clear statement on Parsons' approach to the study of Weber. Bendix had become well known for his interpretations of Weber. In the first review article, Parsons analyzed the immigrant Bendix's Embattled Reason, and he praised its attempt to defend the basic values of cognitive rationality, which he unconditionally shared, and he agreed with Bendix that the question of cognitive rationality was primarily a cultural issue, not a category that could be reduced from biological, economic, and social factors. However, Parsons criticized how Bendix had proceeded, who he felt especially had misrepresented the work of Freud and Durkheim. Parsons found that the misrepresentation was how Bendix tended to conceive the question of systematic theorizing, under the concept of "reductionism". Parsons further found that Bendix's approach suffered from a "conspicuous hostility" to the idea of evolution. Although Parsons assessed that Weber rejected the linear evolutionary approaches of Marx and Herbert Spencer, Weber might not have rejected the question of evolution as a generalized question.

In a second article, a review of Bendix and Guenther Roth's Scholarship and Partisanship: Essays on Max Weber, Parsons continued his line of criticism. Parsons was especially concerned with a statement by Bendix that claimed Weber believed Marx's notion that ideas were "the epiphenomena of the organization of production". Parsons strongly rejected that interpretation: "I should contend that certainly the intellectual 'mature' Weber never was an 'hypothetical' Marxist." Somewhere behind the attitudes of Bendix, Parsons detected a discomfort for the former to move out of an "idiographic" mode of theorizing.

=== Study of US university ===
In 1973, Parsons published The American University, which he had authored with Gerald M. Platt. The idea had originally emerged when Martin Meyerson and Stephen Graubard of the American Academy of Arts and Sciences, in 1969, asked Parsons to undertake a monographic study of the American university system. The work on the book went on for years until it was finished in June 1972.

From a theoretical point of view, the book had several functions. It substantiated Parsons' concept of the educational revolution, a crucial component in his theory of the rise of the modern world. What was equally intellectually compelling, however, was Parsons' discussion of "the cognitive complex", aimed at explaining how cognitive rationality and learning operated as an interpenetrative zone on the level of the general action-system in society. In retrospect, the categories of the cognitive complex are a theoretical foundation to understand what has been called the modern knowledge-based society.

== Retirement ==
He officially retired from Harvard in 1973 but continued his writing, teaching, and other activities in the same rapid pace as before. Parsons also continued his extensive correspondence with a wide group of colleagues and intellectuals. He taught at the University of Pennsylvania, Brown University, Rutgers University, the University of Chicago, and the University of California at Berkeley. At Parsons' retirement banquet, on May 18, 1973, Robert K. Merton was asked to preside, while John Riley, Bernard Barber, Jesse Pitts, Neil J. Smelser, and John Akula were asked to share their experiences of the man with the audience.

=== Brown seminars ===
One scholar who became important in Parsons' later years was professor Martin U. Martel, of Brown University. They had made contact in the early 1970s at a discussion of an article that Martel had written about Parsons' work. Martel arranged a series of seminars at Brown University in 1973 to 1974, and Parsons spoke about his life and work and answered questions from students and faculty. Among the participants at the seminars were Martel, Robert M. Marsh, Dietrich Rueschemeyer, C. Parker Wolf, Albert F. Wessen, A. Hunter Dupree, Philip L. Quinn, Adrian Hayes and Mark A. Shields. In February to May 1974, Parsons also gave the Culver Lectures at Brown and spoke on "The Evolution of Society". The lectures and were videotaped.

=== Refinement of AGIL model ===
Late in life, Parsons began to work out a new level of the AGIL model, which he called "A Paradigm of the Human Condition". The new level of the AGIL model crystallized in the summer of 1974. He worked out the ideas of the new paradigm with a variety of people but especially Lidz, Fox and Harold Bershady. The new metaparadigm featured the environment of the general action system, which included the physical system, the biological system, and what Parsons called the telic system. The telic system represents the sphere of ultimate values in a sheer metaphysical sense. Parsons also worked toward a more comprehensive understanding of the code-structure of social systems and on the logic of the cybernetic pattern of control facilitating the AGIL model. He wrote a bulk of notes: two being "Thoughts on the Linking of Systems" and "Money and Time". He had also extensive discussions with Larry Brownstein and Adrian Hayes on the possibility of a mathematical formalization of Parsons' theory.

=== Sick role theory ===
Parsons had worked intensively with questions of medical sociology, the medical profession, psychiatry, psychosomatic problems, and the questions of health and illness. Most of all Parsons had become known for his concept of "the Sick role". The last field of social research was an issue that Parsons constantly developed through elaboration and self-criticism. Parsons participated at the World Congress of Sociology in Toronto in August 1974 at which he presented a paper, "The Sick Role Revisited: A Response to Critics and an Updating in Terms of the Theory of Action", which was published under a slightly different title, "The Sick Role and the Role of the Physician Reconsidered", in 1975. In this essay, Parsons highlighted that his concept of "sick role" never was meant to be confined to "deviant behavior", but "its negative valuation should not be forgotten". It was also important to keep a certain focus on the "motivatedness" of illness, since there is always a factor of unconscious motivation in the therapeutic aspects of the sick role.

=== Criticism of broken covenant theory ===
In 1975, Bellah published The Broken Covenant. Bellah referred to the sermon delivered by John Winthrop (1587–1649) to his flock on the ship Arbella on the evening of the landing in Massachusetts Bay in 1630. Winthrop declared that the Puritan colonists' emigration to the New World was part of a covenant, a special pact with God, to create a holy community and noted: "For we must consider that we shall be a city on the hill. The eyes of all people are upon us." Parsons disagreed strongly with Bellah's analysis and insisted that the covenant was not broken. Parsons later used much of his influential article, "Law as an Intellectual Stepchild", to discuss Bellah's position.

Parsons thought that Bellah trivialized the tensions of individual interests and society's interests by reducing them to "capitalism"; Bellah, in his characterization of the negative aspects of American society, was compelled by a charismatic-based optimalism moral absolutism.

=== Symbolic interactionism ===
In 1975, Parsons responded to an article by Jonathan H. Turner, "Parsons as a Symbolic Interactionist: A Comparison of Action and Interaction Theory". Parsons acknowledged that action theory and symbolic interactionism should not be regarded as two separate, antagonistic positions but have overlapping structures of conceptualization. Parsons regarded symbolic interactionism and the theory of George Herbert Mead as valuable contributions to action theory that specify certain aspects of the theory of the personality of the individual. Parsons, however, criticized the symbolic interactionism of Herbert Blumer since Blumer's theory had no end to the openness of action. Parsons regarded Blumer as the mirror image of Claude Lévi-Strauss, who tended to stress the quasi-determined nature of macro-structural systems. Action theory, Parsons maintained, represented a middle ground between both extremes.

=== Review of Piaget ===
In 1976, Parsons was asked to contribute to a volume to celebrate the 80th birthday of Jean Piaget. Parsons contributed with an essay, "A Few Considerations on the Place of Rationality in Modern Culture and Society". Parsons characterized Piaget as the most eminent contributor to cognitive theory in the 20th century. However, he also argued that the future study of cognition had to go beyond its narrow encounter with psychology to aim at a higher understanding of how cognition as a human intellectual force was entangled in the processes of social and cultural institutionalization.

In 1978, when James Grier Miller published his famous work Living Systems, Parsons was approached by Contemporary Sociology to write a review article on Miller's work. Parsons had already complained in a letter to A. Hunter Dupree that American intellectual life suffered from a deep-seated tradition of empiricism and saw Miller's book the latest confirmation of that tradition. In his review, "Concrete Systems and "Abstracted Systems", he generally praised the herculean task behind Miller's work but criticized Miller for getting caught in the effort of hierarchize concrete systems but underplay the importance of structural categories in theory building. Parsons also complained about Miller's lack of any clear distinction between cultural and non-cultural systems.

=== Lectures in Japan ===
Japan had long been a keen interest in Parsons' work. As early as 1958, a Japanese translation of Economy and Society appeared. Also, The Structure of Social Action was translated into Japanese. The Social System was translated into Japanese by Tsutomu Sato in 1974. Indeed, Ryozo Takeda had, as early as 1952 in his Shakaigaku no Kozo ("The Framework of Sociology") introduced Japanese scholars to some of Parsons' ideas. Parsons had visited Japan for the first time in 1972 and he gave a lecture on November 25 to the Japanese Sociological Association, "Some Reflections on Post-Industrial Society" that was published in The Japanese Sociological Review. At the same time, Parsons participated in an international symposium on "New Problems of Advanced Societies", held in Tokyo, and he wrote short articles written that appeared in the proceedings of the symposium. Tominaga, born in 1931, a leading figure in Japanese sociology and a professor at the University of Tokyo, was asked by Lidz to contribute to a two-volume collection of essays to honor Parsons. Tominaga wrote an essay on the industrial growth model of Japan and used Parsons' AGIL model.

In 1977, Washio Kurata, the new dean of the Faculty of Sociology of Kwansei Gakuin University, wrote to Parsons and invited him to visit Japan during the 1978–1979 academic year. In early spring, Parsons accepted the invitation, and on October 20, 1978, Parsons arrived at the Osaka Airport, accompanied by his wife, and was greeted by a large entourage.

Parsons began weekly lectures at Kwansei's sociology department from October 23 to December 15. Parsons gave his first public lecture to a huge mass of undergraduates, "The Development of Contemporary Sociology".

On November 17–18, when the Sengari Seminar House was opened, Parsons was invited as the key speaker at the event and gave two lectures, "On the Crisis of Modern Society" and "Modern Society and Religion". Present were Tominaga, Mutsundo Atarashi, Kazuo Muto, and Hideichiro Nakano.

On November 25, lectures at Kobe University were organized by Hiroshi Mannari. Parsons lectured on organization theory to the faculty and the graduate students from the Departments of Economics, Management and Sociology. Also, faculty members from Kyoto and Osaka universities were present. A text was published the next year. On November 30 to December 1, Parsons participated in a Tsukuba University Conference in Tokyo; Parsons spoke on "Enter the New Society: The Problem of the Relationship of Work and Leisure in Relation to Economic and Cultural Values".

On December 5, Parsons gave a lecture at Kyoto University on "A Sociologist Looks at Contemporary U.S. Society".

At a special lecture at Osaka on December 12, Parsons spoke, at the suggestion of Tominaga, on "Social System Theory and Organization Theory" to the Japan Sociological Society.

On December 14, Kwansei Gakuin University granted Parsons an honorary doctor degree. Some of his lectures would be collected into a volume by Kurata and published in 1983. The Parsons flew back to the US in mid-December 1978.

== Death ==
Parsons died May 8, 1979, in Munich on a trip to Germany, where he was celebrating the 50th anniversary of his degree at Heidelberg. Parsons was 76, and was purported to have died of a stroke. The day before, he had given a lecture on social class to an audience of German intellectuals, including Habermas, Niklas Luhmann and Wolfgang Schluchter.

== Work ==
Parsons produced a general theoretical system for the analysis of society, which he called "theory of action", based on the methodological and epistemological principle of "analytical realism" and on the ontological assumption of "voluntaristic action". Parsons' concept of analytical realism can be regarded as a kind of compromise between nominalist and realist views on the nature of reality and human knowledge. Parsons believed that objective reality can be related to only by a particular encounter of such reality and that general intellectual understanding is feasible through conceptual schemes and theories. Interaction with objective reality on an intellectual level should always be understood as an approach. Parsons often explained the meaning of analytical realism by quoting a statement by Henderson: "A fact is a statement about experience in terms of a conceptual scheme."

Generally, Parsons maintained that his inspiration regarding analytical realism had been Lawrence Joseph Henderson and Alfred North Whitehead although he might have gotten the idea much earlier. It is important for Parsons' "analytical realism" to insist on the reference to an objective reality since he repeatedly highlighted that his concept of "analytical realism" was very different from the "fictionalism" of Hans Vaihinger:

We must start with the assertion that all knowledge which purports to be valid in anything like the scientific sense presumes both the reality of object known and of a knower. I think we can go beyond that and say that there must be a community of knowers who are able to communicate with each other. Without such a presupposition it would seem difficult to avoid the pitfall of solipsism. The so-called natural sciences do not, however, impute the "status of knowing subjects" to the objects with which they deal.

=== The Structure of Social Action ===
The Structure of Social Action (SSA), Parsons' most famous work, took form piece by piece. Its central figure was Weber, and the other key figures in the discussion were added, little by little, as the central idea took form. One important work that helped Parsons' central argument in was, in 1932, unexpectedly found: Élie Halévy's La formation du radicalisme philosophique (1901–1904); he read the three-volume work in French. Parsons explained, "Well, Halévy was just a different world ... and helped me to really get in to many clarifications of the assumptions distinctive to the main line of British utilitarian thought; assumptions about the 'natural identity of interest', and so on. I still think it is one of the true masterpieces in intellectual history." Parsons first achieved significant recognition with the publication of The Structure of Social Action (1937), his first grand synthesis, combining the ideas of Durkheim, Weber, Pareto, and others. In 1998, the International Sociological Association listed it as the ninth most important sociological book of the 20th Century.

=== Action theory ===
Parsons' action theory can be characterized as an attempt to maintain the scientific rigour of positivism while acknowledging the necessity of the "subjective dimension" of human action incorporated in hermeneutic types of sociological theories. It is cardinal in Parsons' general theoretical and methodological view that human action must be understood in conjunction with the motivational component of the human act. Social science must consider the question of ends, purpose, and ideals in its analysis of human action. Parsons' strong reaction to behavioristic theory as well as to sheer materialistic approaches derives from the attempt of the theoretical positions to eliminate ends, purpose, and ideals as factors of analysis. Parsons, in his term papers at Amherst, was already criticizing attempts to reduce human life to psychological, biological, or materialist forces. What was essential in human life, Parsons maintained, was how the factor of culture was codified. Culture, however, was to Parsons an independent variable in that it could not be "deducted" from any other factor of the social system. That methodological intention is given the most elaborate presentation in The Structure of Social Action, which was Parsons' first basic discussion of the methodological foundation of the social sciences.

Some of the themes in The Structure of Social Action had been presented in a compelling essay two years earlier in "The Place of Ultimate Values in Sociological Theory".

An intense correspondence and dialogue between Talcott Parsons and Alfred Schutz serves to highlight the meaning of central concepts in The Structure of Social Action.

=== Relations to cybernetics and system theory ===
Parsons developed his ideas during a period when systems theory and cybernetics were very much on the front burner of social and behavioral science. In using systems thinking, he postulated that the relevant systems treated in social and behavioral science were "open:" they were embedded in an environment with other systems. For social and behavioral science, the largest system is "the action system," the interrelated behaviors of human beings, embedded in a physical-organic environment.

As Parsons developed his theory, it became increasingly bound to the fields of cybernetics and system theory but also to Emerson's concept of homeostasis and Ernst Mayr's concept of "teleonomic processes". On the metatheoretical level, Parson attempted to balance psychologist phenomenology and idealism on the one hand and pure types of what Parsons called the utilitarian-positivistic complex, on the other hand.

The theory includes a general theory of social evolution and a concrete interpretation of the major drives of world history. In Parsons' theory of history and evolution, the constitutive-cognitive symbolization of the cybernetic hierarchy of action-systemic levels has, in principle, the same function as genetic information in DNA's control of biological evolution, but that factor of metasystemic control does not "determine" any outcome but defines the orientational boundaries of the real pathfinder, which is action itself. Parsons compares the constitutive level of society with Noam Chomsky's concept of "deep structure".

As Parsons wrote, "The deep structures do not as such articulate any sentences which could convey coherent meaning. The surface structures constitute the level at which this occurs. The connecting link between them is a set of rules of transformation, to use Chomsky's own phrase." The transformative processes and entities are generally, at least on one level of empirical analysis, performed or actualized by myths and religions, but philosophies, art systems, or even semiotic consumer behavior can, in principle, perform that function.

=== Unified concept of social science ===
Parsons' theory reflects a vision of a unified concept of social science and indeed of living systems in general. His approach differs in essence from Niklas Luhmann's theory of social systems because Parsons rejects the idea that systems can be autopoietic, short of the actual action system of individual actors. Systems have immanent capacities but only as an outcome of the institutionalized processes of action-systems, which, in the final analysis, is the historical effort of individual actors. While Luhmann focused on the systemic immanence, Parsons insisted that the question of autocatalytic and homeostatic processes and the question about the actor as the ultimate "first mover" on the other hand was not mutually exclusive. Homeostatic processes might be necessary if and when they occur but action is necessitating.

It is only that perspective of the ultimate reference in action that Parsons' dictum (that higher-order cybernetic systems in history will tend to control social forms that are organized on the lower levels of the cybernetic hierarchy) should be understood. For Parsons, the highest levels of the cybernetic hierarchy as far as the general action level is concerned is what Parsons calls the constitutive part of the cultural system (the L of the L). However, within the interactional processes of the system, attention should be paid especially to the cultural-expressivistic axis (the L-G line in the AGIL). By the term constitutive, Parsons generally referred to very highly codified cultural values especially religious elements (but other interpretation of the term "constitutive" is possible).

Cultural systems have an independent status from that of the normative and orientational pattern of the social system; neither system can be reduced to the other. For example, the question of the "cultural capital" of a social system as a sheer historical entity (in its function as a "fiduciary system"), is not identical to the higher cultural values of that system; that is, the cultural system is embodied with a metastructural logic that cannot be reduced to any given social system or cannot be viewed as a materialist (or behavioralist) deduction from the "necessities" of the social system (or from the "necessities" of its economy). Within that context, culture would have an independent power of transition, not only as factors of actual sociocultural units (like Western civilization) but also how original cultural bases would tend to "universalize" through interpenetration and spread over large numbers of social systems as with Classical Greece and Ancient Israel, where the original social bases had died but the cultural system survived as an independently "working" cultural pattern, as in the case of Greek philosophy or in the case of Christianity, as a modified derivation from its origins in Israel.

=== General theory ===
It is important to highlight that Parsons distinguished two "meanings" or modes of the term general theory. He sometimes wrote about general theory as aspects of theoretical concerns of social sciences whose focus is on the most "constitutive" elements of cognitive concern for the basic theoretical systematization of a given field. Parsons would include the basic conceptual scheme for the given field, including its highest order of theoretical relations and naturally also the necessary specification of this system's axiomatic, epistemological, and methodological foundations from the point of view of logical implications. All the elements would signify the quest for a general theory on the highest level of theoretical concern.

However, general theory could also refer to a more fully/operational system whose implications of the conceptual scheme were "spelled out" on lower levels of cognitive structuralization, levels standing closer to a perceived "empirical object". In his speech to the American Sociological Society in 1947, he spoke of five levels:

1. The General Theory level, which took form primarily as a theory of social systems.
2. The theory of motivation of social behavior, which especially addressed questions of the dynamics of the social system and naturally presupposed theories of motivation, personality and socialization.
3. The theoretical bases of systematic comparative analysis of social structure, which would involve a study of concrete cultures in concrete systems on various levels of generalization.
4. Special theories around particular empirical problem areas.
5. The "fitting" of the theories to specific empirical research techniques, such as statistics, and survey techniques.

During his life, he would work on developing all five fields of theoretical concerns but pay special attention to the development on the highest "constitutive" level, as the rest of the building would stand or fall on the solidity of the highest level.

Despite myths, Parsons never thought that modern societies exist in some kind of perfect harmony with their norms or that most modern societies were necessarily characterized by some high level of consensus or a "happy" institutional integration. Parsons highlighted that is almost logically impossible that there can be any "perfect fit" or perfect consensus in the basic normative structure of complex modern societies because the basic value pattern of modern societies is generally differentiated in such a way that some of the basic normative categories exist in inherent or at least potential conflict with each other. For example, freedom and equality are generally viewed as fundamental and non-negotiable values of modern societies. Each represents a kind of ultimate imperative about what the higher values of humanity. However, as Parsons emphasizes, no simple answer on the priority of freedom or equality or any simple solution on how they possibly can be mediated, if at all. Therefore, all modern societies are faced with the inherent conflict prevailing between the two values, and there is no "eternal solution" as such. There cannot be any perfect match between motivational pattern, normative solutions, and the prevailing value pattern in any modern society. Parsons also maintained that the "dispute" between "left" and "right" has something to do with the fact that they both defend ultimately "justified" human values (or ideals), which alone is indispensable as values but are always in an endless conflictual position to each other.

Parsons always maintained that the integration of the normative pattern in society is generally problematic and that the level of integration that is reached in principle is always far from harmonious and perfect. If some "harmonious pattern" emerges, it is related to specific historical circumstances but is not a general law of the social systems.

=== AGIL paradigm ===
The heuristic scheme that Parsons used to analyze systems and subsystems is called the AGIL paradigm or the AGIL scheme. To survive or maintain equilibrium with respect to its environment, any system must to some degree:

- adapt to that environment (adaptation)
- attain its goals (goal attainment)
- integrate its components (integration), and
- maintain its latent pattern (latency pattern Maintenance), a sort of cultural template

The concepts can be abbreviated as AGIL and are called the system's functional imperatives. Parsons' AGIL model is an analytical scheme for the sake of theoretical "production", but it is not any simple "copy" or any direct historical "summary" of empirical reality. Also, the scheme itself does not explain "anything", just as the periodic table explains nothing by itself in the natural sciences. The AGIL scheme is a tool for explanations and is no better than the quality of the theories and explanation by which it is processed.

In the case of the analysis of a social action system, the AGIL paradigm, according to Parsons, yields four interrelated and interpenetrating subsystems: the behavioral systems of its members (A), the personality systems of those members (G), the social system (as such) (I), and the cultural system of that society (L). To analyze a society as a social system (the I subsystem of action), people are posited to enact roles associated with positions. The positions and roles become differentiated to some extent and, in a modern society, are associated with things such as occupational, political, judicial, and educational roles.

Considering the interrelation of these specialized roles as well as functionally differentiated collectivities (like firms and political parties), a society can be analyzed as a complex system of interrelated functional subsystems:

The pure AGIL model for all living systems:

- (A) Adaptation
- (G) Goal attainment
- (I) Integration
- (L) Latency (pattern maintenance)

The Social System Level:

- The economy — social adaptation to its action and non-action environmental systems
- The polity — collective goal attainment
- The societal community — the integration of its diverse social components
- The fiduciary system — processes that function to reproduce historical culture in its "direct" social embeddedness

The General Action Level:

- The behavioral organism (or system), in later versions, the foci for generalized "intelligence".
- The personality system.
- The social system.
- The cultural system. (See cultural level.)

The cultural level:

- Cognitive symbolization
- Expressive symbolization
- Evaluative symbolization (sometimes called: moral-evaluative symbolization)
- Constitutive symbolization

The Generalized Symbolic media:

Social System level:

- (A) Economic system: Money
- (G) Political system: Political power
- (I) The Societal Community: Influence
- (L) The Fiduciary system (cultural tradition): Value-commitment

Parsons elaborated upon the idea that each of these systems also developed some specialized symbolic mechanisms of interaction analogous to money in the economy, like influence in the social community. Various processes of "interchange" among the subsystems of the social system were postulated.

Parsons' use of social systems analysis based on the AGIL scheme was established in his work Economy and Society (with N. Smelser, 1956) and prevailed in all his subsequent work. However, the AGIL system existed only in a "rudimentary" form in the beginning and was gradually elaborated and expanded in the decades which followed. A brief introduction to Parsons' AGIL scheme appears in Chapter 2 of The American University. There is, however, no single place in his writing in which the total AGIL system is visually displayed or explained: the complete system has to be reconstructed from multiple places in his writing. The system displayed in "The American University" has only the most basic elements and should not be mistaken for the whole system.

=== Social evolutionism ===
Parsons contributed to social evolutionism and neoevolutionism. He divided evolution into four sub-processes:

1. differentiation, which creates functional subsystems of the main system, as discussed above;
2. adaptation, in which those systems evolve into more efficient versions;
3. inclusion of elements previously excluded from the given systems;
4. generalization of values, increasing the legitimization of the increasingly-complex system.

Furthermore, Parsons explored the sub-processes within three stages of evolution:

1. primitive
2. archaic
3. modern

Parsons viewed Western civilization as the pinnacle of modern societies and the United States as the one that is most dynamically developed.

Parsons' late work focused on a new theoretical synthesis around four functions that he claimed are common to all systems of action, from the behavioral to the cultural, and a set of symbolic media that enables communication across them. His attempt to structure the world of action according to a scheme that focused on order was unacceptable for American sociologists, who were retreating from the grand pretensions of the 1960s to a more empirical, grounded approach.

=== Pattern variables ===
Parsons asserted that there are not two dimensions to societies (instrumental and expressive) but that there are qualitative differences between kinds of social interaction.

He observed that people can have personalized and formally detached relationships, based on the roles that they play. The pattern variables are what he called the characteristics that are associated with each kind of interaction.

An interaction can be characterized by one of the identifiers of each contrastive pair:

- affectivity – affective neutrality
- self-orientation – collectivity-orientation
- universalism – particularism
- ascription – achievement
- specificity – diffusity

== Legacy ==
From the 1940s to the 1970s, Parsons was one of the most famous and most influential but also most controversial sociologists in the world, particularly in the US. His later works were met with criticism and were generally dismissed in the 1970s by the view that his theories were too abstract, inaccessible, and socially conservative.

Recently, interest has increased in Parsons' ideas and especially often-overlooked later works. Attempts to revive his thinking have been made by Parsonsian sociologists and social scientists like Jeffrey Alexander, Bryan Turner, Richard Münch, and Roland Robertson, and Uta Gerhardt has written about Parsons from a biographical and historical perspective.

Parsons' best-known pupil was Merton. Parsons was a member of the American Philosophical Society.

== Selected bibliography ==
=== Author ===
- 1983. The Structure and Change of the Social System Edited by Washio Kurata (lectures from Parsons' second visit to Japan).
- 1986, Social Science: A Basic National Resource Edited by S.Z. Klausner & Victor Lidz. (Written around 1948).
- 1991, The Early Essays (Essays from the late 1920s and the 1930s). Edited by Charles Camic.
- 1993, On National Socialism (Essays from the late 1930s and the 1940s). Edited by Uta Gerhardt.
- 2007, American Society: Toward a Theory of Societal Community Edited by Giuseppe Sciortino. Paradigm ISBN 978-1-59451-227-8.

=== Compilations ===
- Talcott Parsons and Kenneth B. Clark (eds.), The Negro American. Beacon Press, 1967.
- Talcott Parsons (ed.), Knowledge and Society: American Sociology. New York: Basic Books, 1968. (collection of essays with an introduction by Talcott Parsons)
- Talcott Parsons and Victor M. Lidz (eds.), Readings in Premodern Societies. Englewood Cliffs, Prentice-Hall, 1972.

=== Translations ===
In 1930 Parson's published a translation of Weber's classic work The Protestant Ethic and the Spirit of Capitalism

- Max Weber, The Protestant Ethic and the Spirit of Capitalism. (1905) Translated by Parsons in 1930. (It was the book's first English translation.)
- Max Weber, The Theory of Social and Economic Organization. (1921–22) Translated by Parsons with Alexander Morell Henderson in 1947.
