= Democracy at work =

Democracy at work may refer to:

== Concepts ==
- Democracy
- Workplace democracy
- Co-determination

== Organizations ==
- Democracy at Work, a nonprofit founded by Richard D. Wolff

== Books ==
- Democracy at work: A cure for capitalism, a 2012 book by Richard D. Wolff
- Democracy at work: Citizens and their governments, a 2007 book by Fredrik Liljeblad
- Democracy at work, a book by Stephen Abel
- Democracy at work, a 1985 book by Tom Schuller
- Democracy at work: The report of the Norwegian industrial democracy program a 1976 book by Fred E. Emery
- Democracy at work: A citizen's guide, a 2016 book by Wil Mara
- Democracy at work: Changing world markets and the future of labor unions, a 1991 book by Lowell Turner
- Democracy at work: Contract, status and post-industrial justice, a 2022 book by Ruth Dukes & Wolfgang Streeck
- Democracy at work: A book for active trade unionists, a 1977 book by BBC
- Democracy at work: A comparative sociology of environmental regulation in the United Kingdom, France, Germany, and the United States, a 2000 book by Richard Münch
