= Functional structuralism =

Sociological framework

Functional structuralism is a spin-off from systems theory in sociology. Systems theory, following Talcott Parsons, began as a structural-functionalist theory, that is, social structures were stressed and placed at the center of analysis, and social functions were deduced from these structures. In functional-structuralist theory, in contrast, the initial focus is on the function of an aspect of society, and only after functions have been specified are enabling structures designated. Functional structuralism is primarily associated with the work of German sociologist Niklas Luhmann.

== See also ==
- Action theory
