= Richard Münch =

Richard Münch may refer to:

- Richard Münch (actor) (1916–1987), German actor
- Richard Münch (sociologist) (born 1945), German sociologist
