= Penny ante =

Penny ante may refer to:

- penny ante, a poker term, see Glossary of poker terms
- penny ante (cards), a card game played for very low stakes
- penny ante, an American slang term, see List of American words not widely used in the United Kingdom
- Penny Ante, a retired pricing game from the game show The Price is Right
- Penny Ante, the B-17G captained by Jesse R. Pitts and covered in his book Return to Base
- Penny-Ante, book publisher
- "Penny Ante", a song from the album Viewers Like You by Tilt
