= Action theory (sociology) =

Sociological concept developed by Talcott Parsons

In sociology, action theory is the theory of social action presented by the American theorist Talcott Parsons.

Parsons established action theory to integrate the study of social action and social order with the aspects of macro and micro factors. In other words, he was trying to maintain the scientific rigour of positivism, while acknowledging the necessity of the "subjective dimension" of human action incorporated in hermeneutic types of sociological theorizing. Parsons sees motives as part of our actions. Therefore, he thought that social science must consider ends, purposes and ideals when looking at actions. Parsons placed his discussion within a higher epistemological and explanatory context of systems theory and cybernetics.

== Action theory ==
Parsons' action theory is characterized by a system-theoretical approach, which integrated a meta-structural analysis with a voluntary theory. Parsons' first major work, The Structure of Social Action (1937) discussed the methodological and meta-theoretical premises for the foundation of a theory of social action. It argued that an action theory must be based on a voluntaristic foundation—claiming neither a sheer positivistic-utilitarian approach nor a sheer "idealistic" approach would satisfy the necessary prerequisites, and proposing an alternative, systemic general theory.

Parsons shared positivism's desire for a general unified theory, not only for the social science but for the whole realm of action systems (in which Parsons included the concept of "living systems"). On the other hand, he departed from them on the criteria for science, particularly on Auguste Comte's proposition that scientists must not look for the "ultimate ends" so as to avoid unanswerable metaphysical questions. Parsons maintained that, at least for the social sciences, a meaningful theory had to include the question of ultimate values, which by their very nature and definition, included questions of metaphysics. As such, Parsons' theory stands at least with one foot in the sphere of hermeneutics and similar interpretive paradigms, which become particularly relevant when the question of "ends" must be considered within systems of action-orientation. As such, system theorists such as Parsons can be viewed as at least partially antipositivist. Parsons was not a functionalist per se, but an action theorist. In fact, he never used the term functionalism to refer to his own theory. Also, his use of the term "structural functionalism", generally understood as a characterization of his theory, was used by Parsons in a special context to describe a particular stage in the methodological development of the social sciences.

One of the main features of Parsons' approach to sociology was the way in which he stated that cultural objects form an autonomous type. This is one of the reasons why Parsons established a careful division between cultural and social system, a point he highlighted in a short statement that he wrote with Alfred Kroeber, and is expressed on his AGIL paradigm. For Parsons, adaptation, goal attainment, integration and latency form the basic characteristics of social action, and could be understood as a fourfold function of a cybernetic system where the hierarchical order is L-I-G-A. The most metaphysical questions in his theory laid embedded in the concept of constitutive symbolization, which represented the pattern maintenance of the cultural system and was the cultural systemic equivalent of latent pattern maintenance through institutions like school and family (or, simply put, "L"). Later the metaphysical questions became more specified in the Paradigm of the Human Condition, which Parsons developed in the years before his death as an extension of the original AGIL theory.

The separation of the cultural and social system had various implications for the nature of the basic categories of the cultural system; especially it had implications for the way cognitive capital is perceived as a factor in history. In contrast to pragmatism, materialism, behaviorism and other anti-Kantian types of epistemological paradigms, which tended to regard the role of cognitive capital as identical with the basic rationalization processes in history, Parsons regarded this question as fundamentally different. Cognitive capital, Parsons maintained, is bound to passion and faith and is entangled as promotional factors in rationalization processes but is neither absorbed or identical with these processes per se.

== See also ==
- Agency (sociology)
- Functional structuralism
- Social actions
- Skopos theory
- Structural functionalism
- Structure and agency
- Theory of structuration

== Sources ==
- Parsons, Talcott; Shils, Edward (1951). Toward a General Theory of Action. Cambridge, Mass.: Harvard University Press.
- Parsons, Talcott (1978). Action Theory and the Human Condition. New York: Free Press. ISBN 9780029239902.
- Parsons, Talcott (1968). The structure of social action: a study in social theory with special reference to a group of recent European writers. New York: Free Press.
