= Uta Gerhardt =

German sociologist

- Born: June 11, 1938 (age 88); Zella-Mehlis, Germany

Academic background
- Education: University of Konstanz

Academic work
- Main interests: German sociology

Uta Gerhardt (born 11 June 1938 in Zella-Mehlis, Germany) is a German sociologist and professor emeritus at the University of Heidelberg. She studied sociology, philosophy and history at the universities of Frankfurt am Main and Berlin. In 1969, she obtained a Ph.D. at the University of Konstanz. The focus of her work is on medical sociology, structural-functionalist role theory, and general sociological theory. She also wrote a major biography of Talcott Parsons.

Uta Gerhardt is not to be confused with the feminist German sociologist Ute Gerhard.

== Selected works ==
=== Books ===
- Gerhardt, Uta (1971). Rollenanalyse als kritische Soziologie; ein konzeptueller Rahmen zur empirischen und methodologischen Begründung einer Theorie der Vergesellschaftung (in German). Berlin, Germany: Neuwied. OCLC 1950340.
- Gerhardt, Uta (1986). Patientenkarrieren: eine medizinsoziologische Studie (in German). Frankfurt am Main, Germany: Suhrkamp. ISBN 9783518113257.
- Gerhardt, Uta (1991). Gesellschaft und Gesundheit: Begründung der Medizinsoziologie (in German). Frankfurt am Main, Germany: Suhrkamp. ISBN 9783518285701.
- Gerhardt, Uta (1998). German sociology. New York, New York: Continuum. ISBN 9780826409591.
- Gerhardt, Uta (1999). Herz und Handlungsrationalität: biographische Verläufe nach koronarer Bypass-Operation zwischen Beruf und Berentung: eine idealtypenanalytische Studie (in German). Frankfurt am Main, Germany: Suhrkamp. ISBN 9783518289846.
- Gerhardt, Uta (2001). Idealtypus: zur methodologischen Begründung der modernen Soziologie (in German). Frankfurt, Germany: Suhrkamp. ISBN 9783518291429.
- Gerhardt, Uta (2005). Soziologie der Stunde Null: zur Gesellschaftskonzeption des amerikanischen Besatzungsregimes in Deutschland 1944-1945/1946 (in German). Frankfurt am Main, Germany: Suhrkamp. ISBN 9783518293683.

=== Journal articles ===
- Gerhardt, Uta (2001). "Social policy and motherhood: the case of East and West Germany". Travail, Genre et Sociétés. 2 (6). La Découverte: 59–81. doi:10.3917/tgs.006.0059.
- Gerhardt, Uta (2008). "Modernity and sociology". Sociétés. 3 (101). De Boeck Supérieur: 35–47. doi:10.3917/soc.101.0035.
