= Renée Fox =

American sociologist (1928–2020)

Renée Claire Fox
- Born: February 15, 1928; New York City, US
- Died: September 23, 2020 (aged 92); Philadelphia, Pennsylvania, US
- Education: Whittier College (1946–1947); Smith College (1944–1945, 1947–1949); Harvard University (1949–1954)
- Organization(s): American Academy of Arts and Sciences, American Philosophical Society, Institute of Medicine of the National Academy of Sciences, American Association for the Advancement of Science, Alpha Omega Alpha honor society
- Title: Chair of the University of Pennsylvania Sociology Department, Annenberg Professor of the Social Sciences, Annenberg Professor Emerita of the Social Sciences, Emerita Senior Fellow of the Center for Bioethics at the University of Pennsylvania
- Term: 1972–1978
- Awards: Radcliffe Graduate School Medal, Leo G. Reeder Award, Lifetime Achievement Award

Renée Claire Fox (February 15, 1928 – September 23, 2020) was an American sociologist.

She was a summa cum laude graduate of Smith College in 1949, earned her Ph.D. in Sociology in 1954 from Radcliffe College, Harvard University, where she studied in the Department of Social Relations. Renée Fox’s major teaching and research interests – sociology of medicine, medical research, medical education, and medical ethics – involved her in first-hand, participant observation-based studies in Continental Europe (particularly in Belgium), in Central Africa (especially in the Democratic Republic of the Congo), and in the People’s Republic of China, as well as in the United States. She lectured in colleges, universities, and medical schools throughout the United States, and taught in a number of universities abroad.

== Early life ==
Renée Claire Fox was born on February 15, 1928, in New York City to parents Fred Fox and Henrietta and had two younger siblings, a brother, Howard, and a sister, Rosa. She was of East European Jewish descent. Her father was the founder of P.F. Fox & Co. Investment Securities. Fox was raised in the city and attended elementary school at P.S 9 with her siblings. She graduated from 8th grade at the age of twelve and went to Julia Richman, an all-girls public school, for high school. Fox graduated high school at the age of 16 and then enrolled in Smith College in Massachusetts.

== Education ==
=== Smith College (1944–1945, 1947–1949) ===
Fox attended Smith College from 1944 to 1945. While attending, she lived in Jordan House. As a freshman, she took courses in Introductory English and Speech, the latter of which was taken to lessen her New York accent. At the end of the year she was named a Sophie Smith Scholar for academic achievement. During the summer after her freshman year, Smith became diagnosed with bulbospinal polio. She spent several months at Sydenham Hospital in Harlem and Knickerbocker Hospital. In September 1947, Fox returned to Smith College to continue in her Junior year. She lived in Chapin House and joined the honors program for sociology. Her senior honors thesis research involved “learning more about the history of the Soviet Union and the American Communist Party, in examining the status and role of intellectuals in American Society, particularly the literary intelligentsia, and in analyzing the symbolic as well as the economic and political impact of the Depression on the American scene.” Based upon her overall academic achievement and her senior thesis work, Fox graduated from Smith in 1949 with summa cum laude honors. Fox returned to Smith in 1975 to be awarded an honorary Doctor of Humane Letters degree and in 1980 as a visiting William Allen Neilson Professor of Sociology and Anthropology. As a visiting professor, she taught courses and delivered a lecture series entitled, “Life, Death, and Modern Medicine.”

=== Whittier College (1946–1947) ===
Following her long bout with polio, Fox and her family ventured to Southern California for the summer of 1946. While there it was found that the weather agreed with the still recovering Fox. Wanting to resume her education, she enrolled in Whittier College located in Whittier, California. She spent one year studying and gaining influence from her peers there before returning to Smith College.

=== Harvard (1949–1954) ===
After graduating from Smith College, Fox entered the Department of Social Relations of Harvard University in pursuit of a Ph.D. in sociology. At the time women were not eligible for doctorate degrees at Harvard and subsequently her degree was issued by Radcliffe College. It was while at Harvard that Fox met sociologist Talcott Parsons. “What is translucently clear is that it was Talcott Parsons, my foremost teacher, and mentor, who had the most profound and enduring influence on shaping the sociologist that I was to become.” Parsons sparked Fox’s initial interest in the field of medical sociology. Fox conducted her dissertation on tuberculosis (TB) patients and their physicians, who both cared for the patients and conducted clinical research on them. Her work was published under the title, "Ward F-Second and the Research Physician: A study of Stress and Ways of Coming to Terms with Stress." This was the foundation for her book "Experiment Perilous".

== Fieldwork in Belgium ==
Fox was widely known for her interdisciplinary and cross-cultural fieldwork. In 1959, Fox began research in Belgium. She conducted ethnographic research there nearly every summer for forty years. To start she was interested in researching Belgians because they often return to Belgium after attending medical school in the United States. Eventually, her focal point became researching Belgium through the lens of their medical system.

In 1978 Fox published “Why Belgium” to explain her area and location of research. In this essay, she described Belgium as particularistic due to society being divided into distinct groups – by social class, religion, political affiliation, language, and region. Fox noted this particularism creates labels that effect Belgian’s education and research opportunities as well as medical access. From a functionalist perspective, Fox viewed Belgium to be divided into these various groups yet functioning through pluralism due to the wide acceptance of ‘separate but equal.’ Fox also observed Belgians to be energized and united due to their Catholic-equivalent of the Protestant work ethic.

There have been disputes over Belgium’s existence, and Fox wrote in “Why Belgium” that she observed distinct culture in Belgium and believed Belgium indeed exists. Her discovery that there is a common culture throughout Belgium has been disputed by Belgians due to Belgium’s particularism.

To develop a deeper understanding of the Belgian society, Fox travelled to Belgium’s former colony, Zaire, which today is the Democratic Republic of the Congo, in Central Africa.

== Médecins Sans Frontières (MSF) ==
In 1992, Fox, already in her late sixties, decided to study one of the most renowned nongovernmental organizations, Médecins Sans Frontières (MSF) and the dilemmas the organization and its members and staff face while delivering medical care, bearing witness of violence in affected areas, and advocacy. Previous work in medical sociology and cultural immersion in Belgium was pertinent to her decision to pursue the endeavor to study the multidimensional problems within MSF.

=== Russia Mission Work (1992–2000) ===
Upon arrival to the Médicins Sans Frontières-Belgium (MSF-B) office in Russia, Fox and a former student, Olga Shevchenko, noticed that the office personnel was divided between nationals and foreigners, although not all Belgian, which lead to difficulties with the decision-making capabilities and the organizational structure among them. However, the Russian staff in the office were helpful in the regard that they had vast amounts of cultural capital and knowledge about Russian lifestyles at the time. In 1992, the main project generated in Russia combated the rising homeless population in Moscow by offering medical consultants, preventative and curative health care, and social consultants. The end goal of the project was to hopefully de-stigmatize how the homeless were seen by the general public and to transfer the program to municipal authorities and the Department of Health in Moscow. MSF-B also coordinated two other programs in Siberia and Chechnya and were dubbed the "Siberia Project" and the "Caucasus Project", respectively.

In 1995, MSF-B moved their attention to prison colonies in Siberia after an appeal was made to have MSF facilitate the treatment of TB in those colonies. When the MSF staff reached the colony, they replenished the community with construction materials, soap, and clothes. Afterward, the medical program was put in motion, providing prisoners with TB screening and anti-TB medication, sanitary conditions, and training for prison medical staff to adopt a protocol to carry out effective treatment and analysis of any future epidemics. MSF-B also tried persuading the Kemerovo government and the Ministry of Justice to adopt the TB control strategy that the World Health Organization (WHO) uses, DOTS. The "Siberia Project" was spread to aid in the treatment of non-prisoners in Mariinsk.

The third program that MSF-B facilitated was based in Chechnya and Dagestan. Both territories were subject to the First Chechen Campaign (1994–1996) and Second Chechen Campaign (1999–2000). The area affected by both wars still are under influence of insurgent activity and has led to the displacement of Chechens. The "Caucasus Project" aimed to provide medical assistance and psychosocial care, food, and shelter to thousands of civilians in Chechnya and Ingushetia.

=== South Africa Mission Work (2001) ===
After observing the work done by MSF in Russia, Fox moved onto field research in Cape Town, South Africa. Once there, her research was narrowed down to the work carried out in the Khayelitsha community, where the HIV/AIDS pandemic was concentrated. The MSF program in Khayelitsha aimed to integrate a regimen of antiretroviral therapy (ART) to eventually have the community have maximized access to treatment through a primary care infrastructure. Additionally, it geared toward breaking down the stigma associated with having the disease by building up "treatment literacy" and community education to lower the transmission. Because the pandemic scale of HIV/AIDS requires long-term surveillance of communities such as Khayelitsha, Fox had the opportunity to make many successive trips to Cape Town, where she observed the evolution of the program. Two macro-issues became apparent while observing the operation of the program: "patient selection" (the endeavor to maximize the treatment and medicines available to as many people with HIV/AIDS) and the struggle to have the government implement a national HIV/AIDS prevention program.

== Medical sociology ==
Fox was primarily a sociologist of medicine. Based on fieldwork in a variety of medical settings in the United States, Belgium, and Zaire, her ethnographic work examined chronic and terminal illness, medical research, therapeutic innovation, medical education and socialization, and bio-ethics. Her work not only considered medical practice but also medical research, patient experiences and the nature of uncertainty for patients and healers. Out of this work grew her interests in medical education as well as medical ethics, a field she engaged some years before there was such a thing as Bioethics.

Fox argued that bioethicists should be trained in the social sciences before being trained in bioethics. In an abstract of a collection of her essays, the author writes that

“Dr. Fox has explored basic cultural phenomena and questions associated with health, illness, and medicine: values, beliefs, symbols, rites, and the nuances of language: ethical and existential dilemmas and dualities; and the complex interrelationships between medicine, science, religion, and magic. She draws systematically and imaginatively upon anthropological, psychological, historical, and biological insights and integrates observations and analyses from her own studies in American, Western European, and Central African societies.”

Fox went on to combine ethnography with history in her study of the development of the Congolese medical profession (1968). During the years of 1962-1967 she made five trips to Congo-Léopoldville. The Republic of Congo was a newly independent country when she was visiting. She studied religion, rebellions, and politics in the Congo. They were gaining their first Congolese physicians and developing medical practices and ethics. Her studies were centered on how the outside factors influenced medical practices.

== Publications (selected) ==
Books

Fox was the author of a number of academic books, mainly on medical sociology and ethics; some of them have been translated into French or Japanese.

- Fox, Renée C. (1979). Essays in Medical Sociology: Journeys Into the Field. Wiley. ISBN 978-0-471-27040-9. "dr renee c fox."
- Fox, Renée C. (1959). Experiment Perilous: Physicians and Patients Facing the Unknown. Free Press. ISBN 978-1560009498.
- Fox, Renée C. (1989). The Sociology of Medicine. Pearson. ISBN 978-0138205072.
- Fox, Renée C. (1979). Essays in Medical Sociology: Journeys into the Field. Wiley. ISBN 978-0887381485.
- Fox, Renée C.; Swazey, Judith (1992). Spare Parts: Organ Replacement in American Society, and Observing Bioethics. Oxford University Press. ISBN 978-0195076509.
- Fox, Renée C. (2008). In the Belgian Chateau: The Spirit and Culture of a European Society in an Age of Change. Ivan R. Dee. ISBN 978-1566637121.
- Fox, Renée C.; Swazey, Judith (1974). The Courage to Fail: A Social View of Organ Transplants and Dialysis. University of Chicago Press. ISBN 978-0226259437.
- Fox, Renée C.; Swazey, Judith (2008). Observing Bioethics. Oxford University Press. ISBN 978-0195365559.
- Fox, Renée C. (2011). In the Field: A Sociologist's Journey. Transaction Publishers. ISBN 978-1412814430.

Book chapters

- Fox, Renée C. (1957). "Chapter 2: Training for Uncertainty". In Merton, Robert K.; Reader, George; Kendall, Patricia L. (eds.). The Student-Physician: Introductory Studies in the Sociology of Medical Education. Cambridge, Mass: Harvard University Press. pp. 207–241. ISBN 978-0674846166.
- Fox, Renée C. (2000). "Medical Uncertainty Revisited". In Albrecht, Gary L.; Fitzpatrick, Ray; Scrimshaw, Susan C. (eds.). The Handbook of Social Studies in Health and Medicine. London: Sage Publications. pp. 409–427. ISBN 978-0761956174.
  Revised Version in Bendelow, Gillian; Carpenter, Mick; Vautier, Carol; et al., eds. (2002). Gender, Health, and Healing: The Public/Private Divide. London & New York: Routledge. pp. 236–252. ISBN 978-0415235730.
- Leif, Harold I.; Fox, Renée C. (1963). "Training for 'Detached Concern' in Medical Students". In Leif, Harold I.; et al. (eds.). The Psychological Basis of Medical Practice. New York: Harper and Row. pp. 12–35. ISBN 978-0761956174.

Articles

- Fox, RC (May 1962). "The Medical Scientists in a Château". Science. 136 (3515): 476–483. Bibcode:1962Sci...136..476F. doi:10.1126/science.136.3515.476. PMID 13894391.
- de Craemer, W; Vansina, J; Fox, RC (October 1976). "Religious Movements in Central Africa". Comparative Studies in Society and History. 18 (4): 458–475. doi:10.1017/s0010417500008392. S2CID 143885559.
- Fox, RC (Winter 1977). "The Medicalization and Demedicalization of American Society". Daedalus. 106 (1): 9–22. PMID 10235991.
- Fox, RC (November 1978). "Why Belgium?". European Journal of Sociology. XIX (2): 205–228. doi:10.1017/S0003975600005221. S2CID 247632234.
- Blumberg, BS; Fox, RC (March 1985). "The Daedalus Effect: Changes in Ethical Questions Relating to Hepatitis B Virus". Annals of Internal Medicine. 102 (3): 390–394. doi:10.7326/0003-4819-102-3-390. PMID 3155924.
- Fox, RC (December 1995). "Medical Humanitarianism and Human Rights: Reflections on Doctors Without Borders and Doctors of the World". Social Science & Medicine. 41 (12): 1607–1626. doi:10.1016/0277-9536(95)00144-v. PMID 8746861.
- Fox, RC; Swazey, JP (Spring 1985). "Medical Morality Is Not Bioethics: Medical Ethics in China and the United States". Perspectives in Biology and Medicine. 27 (3): 336–360. doi:10.1353/pbm.1984.0060. PMID 6728631. S2CID 11591258.
- Fox, RC (Winter 1996). "Experiment Perilous: Forty-Five Years as a Participant Observer of Patient-Oriented Clinical Research". Perspectives in Biology and Medicine. 39 (2): 206–226. doi:10.1353/pbm.1996.0012. PMID 11644830. S2CID 2143412.
- Fox, RC (September 2004). "Observations and Reflections of a Perpetual Fieldworker". Annals of the American Academy of Political and Social Science. 595 (1): 309–326. doi:10.1177/0002716204266635. S2CID 144478802.
