= Norman Birnbaum =

American sociologist (1926–2019)

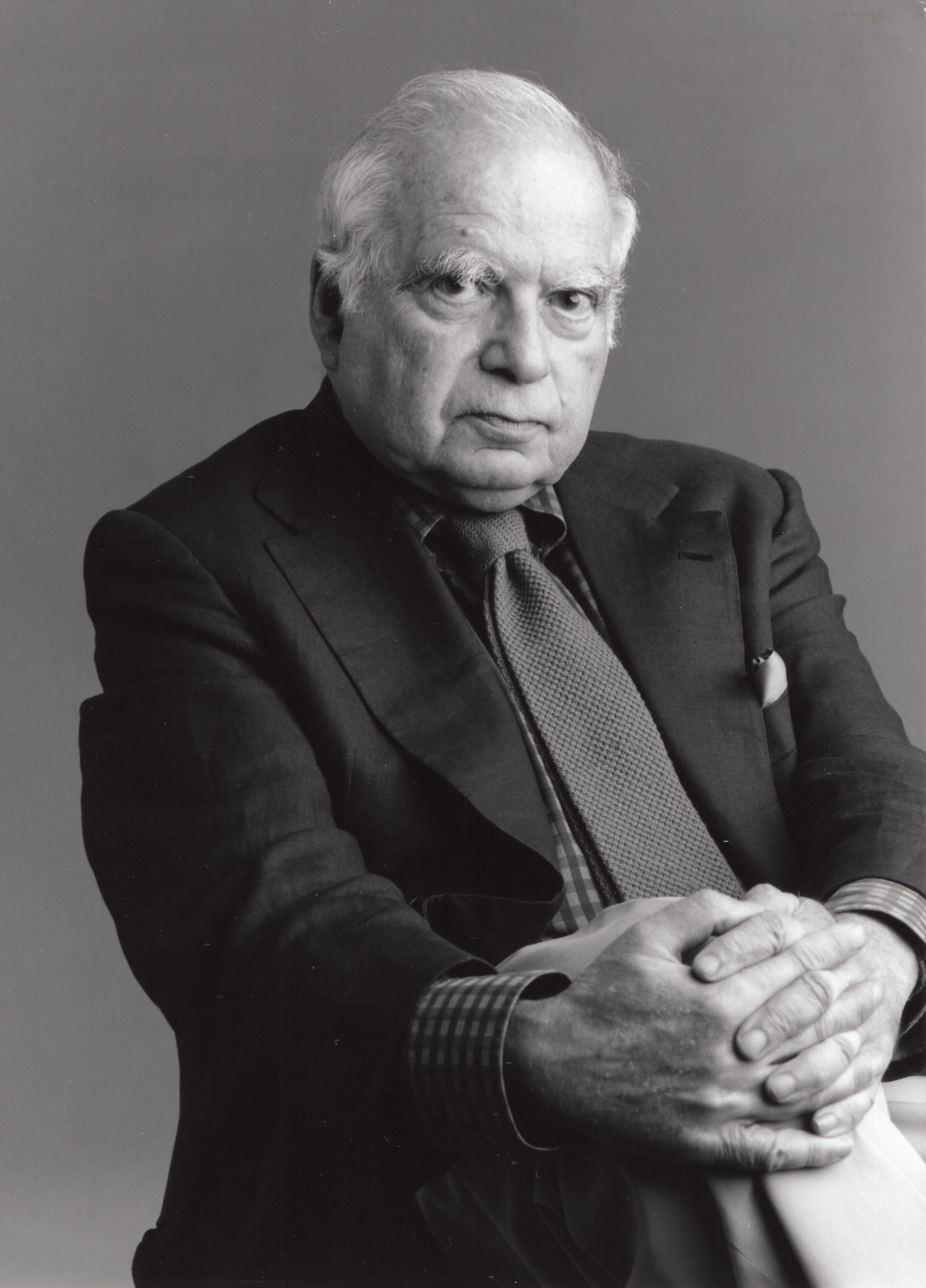
- Official portrait from the Georgetown University Law Center
- Born: July 21, 1926; New York City, U.S.
- Died: January 4, 2019 (aged 92); Washington, D.C., U.S.

Academic background
- Education: Williams College; Harvard University (PhD)
- Thesis: Social Structure and the German Reformation (1958)
- Doctoral advisor: Talcott Parsons

Academic work
- Institutions: Nuffield College, Oxford
- Notable students: Steven Lukes

Norman Birnbaum (July 21, 1926 – January 4, 2019) was an American sociologist. He was an emeritus professor at the Georgetown University Law Center, and a member of the editorial board of The Nation. In 2017 he received Germany's highest award, the Grand Cross of the Order of Merit.

== Early life ==
He was educated in New York City's public schools, at Williams College, and earned a doctorate in sociology from Harvard University in 1958, supervised by Talcott Parsons. He taught at the London School of Economics and Political Science, Oxford University, the University of Strasbourg, Amherst College, served on the Graduate Faculty of the New School for Social Research and was Distinguished Fulbright Professor at the University of Bologna.

Birnbaum's pedagogical work included the introduction of sociology to the undergraduate curricula at Amherst and Oxford. A founding member of the editorial board of New Left Review, was active in politics on both sides of the Atlantic He had been an advisor to American trade unions and members of Congress, as well as to a number of social movements and political parties in Europe. He contributed regularly to a number of publications, including openDemocracy, El País in Spain, and the German daily Die Tageszeitung. He published his memoir, From the Bronx to Oxford and Not Quite Back, in 2018.

== Bibliography ==
=== Books ===
- The Crisis of Industrialized Society, 1969.
- (with Gertrud Lenzer), Sociology and Religion, 1969.
- Toward a Critical Sociology, 1971.
- (edited) Beyond the Crisis, 1976.
- Social Structure and The German Reformation, 1980.
- The Radical Renewal: The Politics of Ideas in Modern America, 1988.
- Searching for the Light: Essays on Thought and Culture, 1993.
- After Progress: American Social Reform and European Socialism in the Twentieth Century, 2001.
- Norman Birnbaum: From the Bronx to Oxford and Not Quite Back (memoir), 2019

=== Selected op-eds ===
- "Absent from the persecutory chorus," Financial Times, September 15, 1998.
- "Rather More Critical View of Kenneth Starr," Financial Times, April 7, 1998.
- "Why Not a Muslim on Anti-Terrorism Commission?" in national newspaper syndication, July 14, 1999.
- "Terrorism Panel No Place for Anti-Arab Bias," in national newspaper syndication, July 18, 1999.
- "Jewish Minority Doesn't Speak for All," in national newspaper syndication, July 18, 1999.
- "Critics Assured Place in History," The Financial Times, October 5, 1999.
- "Adviser's post carries not a lot of power," The Financial Times, March 4, 2000.
- "Dynasties in competition," The Financial Times, January 24, 2001.
- "Americans able to think for themselves," The Financial Times, October 16, 2001.
- "US spin doctor," The Independent, March 21, 2002.
- "What class consciousness means in US," The Financial Times, June 5, 2002.
- Birnbaum, Norman (June 28, 2007). "'Did the Revolution have to fail?' : an exchange". The New York Review of Books. 54 (11): 71, 74.
