= Jesse R. Pitts =

American sociologist (1921–2003)

Jesse Richard Pitts
- Born: June 13, 1921; East Palestine, Ohio, United States
- Died: August 2, 2003 (aged 82); Charlottesville, Virginia
- Citizenship: United States
- Education: Harvard University
- Scientific career
- Fields: Sociology
- Workplaces: Wayne State University; Michigan State University; Oakland University; University of Virginia
- Doctoral advisor: Talcott Parsons

Jesse Richard Pitts (1921–2003), was an American sociologist specializing in deviance and social control, family sociology, sociological theory, French society, and criminology. He is considered one of the leading disciples of Talcott Parsons, dean of American sociologists for much of the 20th century. Pitts is perhaps best known for his contributions to a large textbook on sociology, Theories of Society: Foundations of Modern Sociological Theory, edited by Parsons and published in 1961. He pioneered sociological work on marginality, deviance and conformity. He was interested particularly in criminology and the institutional treatment of mental illness. Raised on both sides of the Atlantic, Pitts felt at home in France as much as in the United States. He created the Franco-American periodical The Tocqueville Review, serving as editor from 1978 to 1991.

== Early life ==
Pitts was born in East Palestine, Ohio, on June 13, 1921. He was the only child of Howard Earl ("Doc") Pitts (1889–1951), a veterinarian from Marietta, Ohio, who fought in France with the Expeditionary Forces during World War I. Before returning to the States, Doc married Denyse Dinin in Decize. When Jesse (named after Jess Willard, the boxer) was 7, his parents separated and he went to France with his mother. He did not see his father again until a summer vacation in 1937 where he met his numerous cousins in Marietta, Ohio.

Pitts developed an early interest in politics in France and, at age 15, joined the communist party and distributed leaflets. At 16, French police turned him back from the Spanish frontier as he sought to join the Spanish Civil War.

== Harvard and World War II ==
He returned to the United States in 1938 to attend Harvard University in Cambridge, Massachusetts. Initially interested in economics, he was attracted to sociology by Parsons, who taught at Harvard. Majoring in sociology, with a minor in economics, he graduated magna cum laude in June 1941. At Harvard, Pitts joined the Trotskyites but lost interest in the movement following the fall of Paris to the Nazis in June 1940. He tried to enlist and was placed on a waiting list in Canada but was never called up. After graduation he found a job at Macy's in New York. While he found the job unsatisfying, his roommate Jim Chapin introduced him to Jazz which was thriving in New York City and he truly enjoyed (later he would often start his classes with Miles Davis recordings.) Once the U.S. declared war, he enlisted in the US Air Corps and went into pilot training then sent to England in 1943, to the Base in Kimbolton as part of the 379th Bombardment Group (heavy). As second lieutenant he accomplished 25 missions (including 3 first missions over Berlin) over France and Germany as copilot of a B-17 bomber (H). Back in the U.S. he instructed new pilots, sold war bonds, and was a pilot for the Air Transport Command when he was discharged in October 1945. He was awarded the Distinguished Flying Cross as well as the French Croix de Guerre. He started writing about his experience with the intention to write a book but this would go on hold until he retired from teaching 50 years later.

== Career ==
Intending to return to Harvard for his Ph.D. Pitts returned to France and created an import-export company in Casablanca to generate funds required for his academic goal. In May 1947, he married Monique Bonnier, daughter of the late Claude Bonnier, engineer and hero of the French Resistance. Jesse and Monique were married in the American Cathedral in Paris.

Jesse Pitts returned to Harvard in the summer of 1948 and by June 1950 was ready to go to France to work on his thesis, with Talcott Parsons as adviser. The stay in France extended to 3 years, as Jesse wrote for Le Monde and lectured. In 1953, Parsons asked Pitts to join him in England to work on the projected book: Theories of Society. co-authored by T. Parsons, Ed. Shils, Kaspar Naegele and Jesse R. Pitts. The book was published in 1961 and became a standard text for Sociology students.

Pitts received his Ph.D. in 1958 and began his teaching career in Detroit, Michigan, at Wayne State University, as assistant professor, then as associate professor. In 1964, he left for Oakland University, in Rochester Michigan, where he taught from 1964 to 1986, as full professor and chairman. He taught at the Harvard Summer School in 1971 and 1975. He was twice a Fulbright Fellow. During a long stay in Paris (1966–1968) he was a lecturer at the Ecole des Hautes Etudes (Paris-Sorbonne). While living in Paris he participated in Television broadcasts and wrote newspapers articles. He wrote a book on the 1968 May events in France, but decided against publishing it. A perfectionist, he put aside many works that did not satisfy him. Politically, while Pitts had held left wing views in his youth, he shifted to more conservative opinions. Almost all of his friends and colleagues were liberal intellectuals and solid Democrats (Democratic Party (United States)), but Pitts was never reticent to debate issues, often appearing on talk shows and as a columnist for various publications.

== The Tocqueville Review ==
Pitts founded The Tocqueville Review/La Revue Tocqueville in 1978 and was its editor until 1991. The Review is a French-American bilingual journal devoted to the comparative study of social change in the spirit of Alexis de Tocqueville's pioneer investigations. Pitts recruited many of his colleagues to author essays on current affairs, history, and political philosophy. In 2003, at the memorial event in Charlottesville, Professor Ted Caplow, first president and founder of the Tocqueville Society, defined the review as:"...a proud monument and one that will long honor him." Caplow also said: "...its intellectual standards are exceptionally high and it continues to attract contributions, both in English and French, from major scholars and public figures on both sides of the Atlantic." Pitts was a member of the Tocqueville Jury which awarded the Prix Alexis de Tocqueville to international scholars.

== Retirement ==
In 1986, Jesse retired to Charlottesville. The Department of Sociology at UVA recruited him to teach an occasional course as a lecturer. Fully retiring in 1991, both from teaching and as editor of the Tocqueville Review, he concentrated on writing his war memories and devoted much time with former crewmen of the Penny Ante and other friends from his Bomb Group the 379th. He also joined the Virginia Chapter of the Historical Society (Eighth Air Force) and launched its Newsletter: Plane Talk, and served as editor until 1997.

His health declining, Pitts barely finished his Memoirs. He died peacefully on August 2, 2003, and was buried in Charlottesville with military honors. His Memoirs were published in 2004, under the title Return to Base, in hard cover followed by a British paper back edition in 2006. A French translation, Retour sur Kimbolton, was published in Paris in 2006, and a second edition appeared in 2009.

== Publications ==
- 1957: The Bourgeois Family and French Economic Retardation, Ph.D. dissertation, Harvard University
- 1961: Theories of Society: Foundations of Modern Sociological Theory, Two Volumes in One, with Talcott Parsons (Editor), Edward Shils & Kaspar D. Naegele, New York: The Free Press
- 1963: In Search of France co-authored with Stanley Hoffmann; Cambridge, Harvard University Press
- 1964: Social Approaches to Mental Patient Care, with Morrie Schwartz S. and Charlotte Green Schwartz; co-authors: Mark G. Field, Elliot G. Mishler, Simon Olshansky, Jesse R. Pitts, Rhona Rapoport and Warren T. Vaughan Jr.: New York and London, Columbia University Press
- 1972: Strike at Oakland University, Change (February 1972), p. 18.
- 1980: Talcott Parsons: the sociologist as the last Puritan, American Sociologist, vol. 15, 1980, p. 62 - 64. (This article is based on an earlier address by Pitts, in 1979, to the American Sociological Society.)
- 1986: Celebrating Tocqueville's Democracy in America, 1835–1985, with Olivier Zunz [eds.]; Charlottesville: University Press of Virginia
- 2004: Return to Base: Memoirs of a B-17 Co-pilot, Kimbolton, England, 1943-1944 xix, 280 p., 17pp. of plates: ill., maps, Charlottesville, VA: Howell Press, 2004; revised and published in Great Britain, 2006; and published in French as "Retour sur Kimbolton" in France, 2010
