= Robert F. Bales =

American sociologist (1916–2004)

Robert Freed Bales (March 9, 1916 – June 16, 2004) was an American social psychologist. He specialized in small group interpersonal interaction and developed the SYMLOG (systematic multi-level observation of groups) method of group observation.

== Biography ==
Bales was born in Ellington, Missouri on March 9, 1916. He received a B.A. and M.S. in sociology from the University of Oregon. In 1945, he received a Ph.D. in sociology from Harvard University. Bales then became a professor at Harvard, working in the university's Laboratory of Human Relations. In 1950, Bales published a book titled Interaction Process Analysis: A Method for the Study of Small Groups in which he described in great detail his musings of human interaction within small groups.

Bales died in San Diego, California on June 16, 2004, at the age of 88.

== Interaction process analysis ==
The goal of this method was to capture direct face-to-face interaction as they takes place, then to analyze the interactions into useful information. In order to capture an interaction, Bales’ method utilized observers. The observer's job is to interpret and categorize the observed behavior. This is not without error as the observer must infer intent and meaning of the observable action. The observer is supposed to be well trained on the variables they are categorizing and they should be able to do it effortlessly; however, human raters bring with them their own preconceived schemas and heuristics. Human raters are subject to subconscious biases and fallacies. To circumvent this pitfall, Bales’ method makes use of multiple observers and an inter-rater reliability is then derived from both raters’ produced data. Bales’ method was formed under two assumptions. The first assumption is that the observer must assume that all small groups are similar in that any given group contains a variety of people, or follows a normal distribution of variance. These group members share task problems that materialize in relation to their situational context, but also socio-emotional problems that materialize in the interaction with other members of their group. The second assumption is that each individual's behavior can affect those problems. Observers must categorize each individual's behavior continuously, capturing behavior as a sequence of events through time. The unit of measure is the smallest discriminable segment of verbal or nonverbal behavior the observer can differentiate and classify. He referred to the content of these categories to be “process content” as opposed to the topical content. Bales claimed process content, which later became known as group process, was at the core of small groups; what remained when situational variance was stripped away.

== SYMLOG ==
The use of SYMLOG and the certification of SYMLOG consultants is now maintained by the SYMLOG Consulting Group, whose formation Bales supported. In 2016, the group honoured the centenary of Bales' birth by publishing excerpts from a video interview which he gave in 1996.

== Awards ==
- Distinguished Career Award of the American Association of Specialists in Group Work (1982)
- Cooley-Mead Award of the American Sociological Association (1983)
- Distinguished Teaching Award of the American Psychological Foundation (1984)

== Bibliography ==
- Bales, R. F., (1950), Interaction Process Analysis; A Method for the Study of Small Groups, Cambridge, Massachusetts: Addison-Wesley Press
- Bales, R. F., (1950), "A Set of Categories for the Analysis of Small Group Interaction" in American Sociological Review, Vol. 15, No. 2 (Apr., 1950), pp. 257–263
- Hare, Alexander Paul, Edgar F. Borgatta, and Robert Freed Bales. Small groups. Knopf, 1965.
- Bales, Robert Freed. "Personality and interpersonal behavior." (1970).
- Bales, Robert Freed, Stephen P. Cohen, and Stephen A. Williamson. SYMLOG: A system for the multiple level observation of groups. New York: Free Press, 1979
- Parsons, Talcott, Robert Freed Bales, and Edward A. Shils. Working papers in the theory of action. Greenwood Press, 1981.
- Polley, Richard Brian, Hare A. Paul, and Stone Philip J. The SYMLOG Practitioner. Applications of Small Group Research. Praeger, 1988.
- Bales, Robert Freed. "Social Interaction Systems: Theory and Measurement: Book review." (2000): 199.
