= Wolfgang Schluchter =

German sociologist

Wolfgang Schluchter (born 4 April 1938 in Ludwigsburg, Germany) is a German sociologist and, as of 2006, professor emeritus at Heidelberg University. Schluchter is recognized as a leading sociologist of religion and an authority on the history of sociological theory, in particular on the work of Max Weber. He was one of the editors of the Max Weber-Gesamtausgabe, alongside Wolfgang J. Mommsen and Johannes Winckelmann. Gangolf Hübinger succeeded Mommsen after he died in 2004. The project was completed in June 2020, with forty-seven volumes. Schluchter was visiting professor at several universities worldwide, including the University of Pittsburgh, The New School for Social Research, and the University of California, Berkeley.

== Selected works in English translation ==
- Max Weber’s Vision of History. Ethics and Methods. University of California Press, Berkeley, 1979. ISBN 0520052269 (with Guenther Roth)
- The Rise of Western Rationalism: Max Weber's Developmental History. University of California Press, Berkeley, 1985. ISBN 9780520054646
- Rationalism, Religion, and Domination. A Weberian Perspective. University of California Press, Berkeley, 1989.
- Paradoxes of Modernity. Culture and Conduct in the Theory of Max Weber. Stanford University Press, Stanford, 1996.
- Max Weber and Islam. Transaction Publishers, New Brunswick, N.J., 1995 ISBN 1560004002 (edited with Toby Huff)
- Public Spheres and Collective Identities. Transaction Publishers, New Brunswick, NJ, 2000 (edited with Shmuel N. Eisenstadt and Björn Wittrock)

== General and cited sources ==
- Lichtblau, Klaus (January 2022). "On the Conclusion of the Max Weber Gesamtausgabe: A Meta-Critical Review". Max Weber Studies. 22 (1). Translated by Whimster, Sam: 74–124. doi:10.1353/max.2022.0004. ISSN 1470-8078. S2CID 252017012. Project MUSE 862056.
- Oakes, Guy (August 2021). "Thinking with Wolfgang Schluchter: Wolfgang Schluchter, Mit Max Weber. Tübingen: Mohr Siebeck 2020, 289 S., br., 59.00 €". Soziologische Revue. 44 (2): 194–203. doi:10.1515/srsr-2021-0026. ISSN 0343-4109. S2CID 237355614.
- Segre, Sandro (January 2013). "On Wolfgang Schluchter's Interpretation of Weber". Max Weber Studies. 13 (1): 65–80. doi:10.1353/max.2013.a808740. ISSN 1470-8078. JSTOR 24579965. S2CID 145073362. Project MUSE 808740.
