= Guenther Roth =

German-American sociologist (1931–2019)

Guenther Roth (German spelling Günther Roth; 12 January 1931 – 18 May 2019) was a German-American sociologist. He was recognized as the leading scholar, translator and editor of the work of Max Weber in the English-speaking world; together with Claus Wittich, he translated and edited the first complete version of Weber's classic Economy and Society in English. He was professor emeritus at Columbia University. Later, his research interest extended to the biographical aspects of the sociological classics, in particular the genealogy of Weber's family.

Roth studied at Goethe University Frankfurt under Theodor W. Adorno, Max Horkheimer and Friedrich Pollock and worked at the Institute for Social Research in Frankfurt. He arrived in the United States in 1953 and completed his graduate studies at the University of California, Berkeley. In 1960, he obtained a PhD under Reinhard Bendix with a dissertation on the development of social democracy in Imperial Germany (1871–1918).

Roth became a U.S. citizen in 1963. He taught at the University of Washington from 1970 until 1988 and then at Columbia University until his retirement in 1997.

He was married to Columbia historian Caroline Bynum.

He died on May 18, 2019.

== Selected works in English ==
- The Social Democrats in Imperial Germany. A Study in Working-Class Isolation and National Integration. Totowa: Bedminster Press, 1963; re-issue New York: Arno Press, 1979.
- Scholarship and Partisanship. Essays on Max Weber. Berkeley: University of California Press, 1971 (with Reinhard Bendix)
- Max Weber’s Vision of History. Ethics and Methods Berkeley: University of California Press, 1979 (with Wolfgang Schluchter)
- Weber’s ‘Protestant Ethic’: Origins, Evidence, Contexts. New York: Cambridge University Press, 1993 (edited with Hartmut Lehmann)

== Sources ==
- Lee, Mary Jungeun (November 2001). "University Professor Caroline Walker Bynum Reflects on Influence, Identity and Teaching". Columbia College Today. Vol. 28, no. 2. ISSN 0572-7820. Archived from the original on 3 June 2023.
- Oakes, Guy (1997). "Guenther Roth and Weber Studies in America". International Journal of Politics, Culture and Society. 11 (1): 175–179. doi:10.1023/A:1025131321601. ISSN 0891-4486. S2CID 141340074.
- Kalberg, Stephen (2020). "Obituary: Guenther Roth, 1931–2019". Max Weber Studies. 20 (1): 87–90. doi:10.1353/max.2020.0002. ISSN 1470-8078. JSTOR 10.15543/maxweberstudies.20.1.87. S2CID 258101482. Project MUSE 808530.
