= The Structure of Social Action =

1937 book by Talcott Parsons

- Title page for The Structure of Social Action (1949)
- Author: Talcott Parsons
- Language: English
- Subject: Sociology
- Genre: Non-fiction
- Publication date: 1937

The Structure of Social Action is a 1937 book by sociologist Talcott Parsons.

In 1998 the International Sociological Association listed the work as the ninth most important sociological book of the 20th century, behind Jürgen Habermas' The Theory of Communicative Action (1981) but ahead of Erving Goffman's The Presentation of Self in Everyday Life (1956).
