= Richard Münch (sociologist) =

German sociologist

Richard Münch (born 13 May 1945 in Niefern near Pforzheim, Germany) is a German sociologist and, as of 2013, emeritus of excellence at the University of Bamberg. He graduated from the Hebel Gymnasium Pforzheim in 1965. He studied sociology, philosophy, and psychology at the University of Heidelberg from 1965 to 1970, earning the degrees of Magister Artium in 1969 and Dr. phil. in 1971. His habilitation in the field of sociology took place at the University of Augsburg in 1972 where he was employed as a research assistant at the Chair of Sociology and Communication Studies from 1970 to 1974. From 1974 to 1976 he taught as Professor of Sociology at the University of Cologne, from 1976 to 1995 as Professor of Social Science at the Heinrich Heine University of Düsseldorf, and from 1995 to 2013 as Professor of Sociology at the Otto Friedrich University of Bamberg where he was appointed Emeritus of Excellence in 2013. Since 2015, he has been a senior professor of social theory and comparative macrosociology at Zeppelin University in Friedrichshafen, Lake Constance.

== Life and career ==
Richard Münch is a member of the Berlin-Brandenburg Academy of Sciences and Humanities, was Chairman of the Advisory Board at the Max Planck Institute for the Study of Societies in Cologne, Luhmann Visiting Professor at the University of Bielefeld, Visiting Professor at the Georg August University in Göttingen, and Visiting Professor at the University of California, Los Angeles, on several occasions. He served on the editorial boards of the American Journal of Sociology, the Annual Review of Social Theory, Sociological Theory, Zeitschrift für Soziologie, and Soziologische Revue. In 2018, the German Sociological Association honored him with the Award for Outstanding Lifetime Achievement in Scholarship, and in 2022, he received the Meyer-Struckmann Award for Outstanding Research in the Humanities and Social Sciences.

His primary field is sociological theory and comparative macrosociology. In the 1980s, he was instrumental in popularizing Parsons in Germany and defended his functionalist "grand theory" of action against competing approaches, such as rational choice and Niklas Luhmann's systems theory, which had been gaining ground since the 1970s.

In the 1990s and 2000s, Münch's work diversified, and he focused more strongly on empirical studies on cultural, political and economical topics ranging from the impact of mass communication to globalization and European integration. More recently, his focus has been on current developments and reforms in the German system of higher education, of which he is a vocal public critic. His publications are focused on the rise of modern culture and its different shape in the United Kingdom, France, Germany and the United States, regulative cultures of environmental politics in these countries, nation and citizenship in the same countries, the problem of democratic governance in the European Union, the change from the welfare state to the competition state, and the change of solidarity in the global division of labour.

Münch has dealt extensively with the global spread of an "academic capitalism". Universities act as enterprises that generate resources in order to convert them into profits in material and symbolic capital, i.e., money and prestige, in competition with other universities. They accumulate money and prestige in a circular process. In this way, an oligopoly of wealthy elite universities emerges which stand out from the broad mass of only modestly endowed universities. In order to hold their own in external competition, entrepreneurial universities need effective internal quality management and strategic planning for the acquisition of third-party funding through collaborative research. The entrepreneurial university is therefore, especially with the broad mass struggling for recognition, also an audit university and a strategically planning third-party funding university.

Together with his team, Münch has conducted in-depth studies of international educational competition. According to their analysis, in the context of international benchmarking between education systems, a paradigm of school governance has emerged worldwide that follows the principles of New Public Management (NPM). Schools are to be given more autonomy, parents more freedom in school choice and more consumer rights. Regular and centrally coordinated evaluations of principals and teachers, as well as student achievement tests, are intended to ensure that the new freedoms are not abused but used to improve student performance. A powerful network of global actors has formed around the OECD, as the provider of the most influential international education benchmarking with its Programme for International Student Assessment (PISA), which is vigorously promoting this agenda worldwide. However, according to the analyses of Münch and his team, there is no evidence that the reforms implemented in many countries have led to improvement, either in terms of average performance or in terms of reducing inequality in educational achievement and the influence of social origin on that achievement.

== Selected works in English ==
- The Micro-Macro Link. Berkeley, CA: University of California Press, 1987 (edited with Jeffrey C. Alexander, Bernhard Giesen, and Neil J. Smelser)
- Theory of Action. Towards a New Synthesis Going Beyond Parsons. London: Routledge & Kegan Paul, 1987
- Understanding Modernity. Towards a New Perspective Going Beyond Durkheim and Weber. London: Routledge & Kegan Paul, 1988
- Theory of Culture. Berkeley, CA: University of California Press, 1992 (edited with Neil J. Smelser)
- Sociological Theory I. From the 1850s to the 1920s. Chicago: Nelson Hall, 1994
- Sociological Theory II. From the 1920s to the 1960s. Chicago: Nelson Hall, 1994
- Sociological Theory III. Development Since the 1960s. Chicago: Nelson Hall, 1994
- Democracy at Work. A Comparative Sociology of Environmental Regulation in the United Kingdom, France, Germany, and the United States. Westport, Conn.: Praeger Publishers (Greenwood Press), 2001 (with Christian Lahusen, Markus Kurth, Cornelia Borgards, Carsten Stark and Claudia Jauß)
- The Ethics of Modernity. Formation and Transformation in Britain, France, Germany and the United States. Lanham, MD: Rowman & Littlefield, 2001
- Nation and Citizenship in the Global Age. From National to Transnational Civil Ties. Houndsmills, Basingstoke, London: Palgrave (MacMillan), 2001
- European Governmentality. The Liberal Drift of Multilevel Governance. London: Routledge, 2010
- Inclusion and Exclusion in the Liberal Competition State: The Cult of the Individual. London: Routledge 2012
- Academic Capitalism: Universities in the Global Struggle for Excellence. London and New York: Routledge, 2014
- The Global Division of Labour: Development and Inequality in World Society. Houndmills, Basingstoke: Palgrave Macmillan, 2016
