= List of sociological associations =

This article is a list of sociological associations. It is intended to cover all professional associations dedicated to sociological inquiry or a subset thereof, whether or not the association is currently active.

== A ==
- Alabama-Mississippi Sociological Association
- American Sociological Association
- Armenian Sociological Association
- Asia Pacific Sociological Association
- Association for Humanist Sociology
- Association for the Sociology of Religion, Formed in 1938 as the American Catholic Sociological Society
- Association Francaise de Sociologie (France)
- Association of Applied and Clinical Sociology (AACS)
- Australian Sociological Association
- Azerbaijani Sociological Association

== B ==
- Bangladesh Sociological Society (BSS)
- Berufsverband Deutscher Soziologinnen und Soziologen e.v.
- Brazilian Sociological Society
- British Sociological Association
- Bulgarian Sociological Association

== C ==
- California Sociological Association
- Canadian Association of French-speaking Sociologists and Anthropologists
- Canadian Sociological Association
- Caribbean Sociological Association
- Chinese Sociological Association
- Clinical Sociology

== D ==
- Danish Sociological Association
- District of Columbia Sociological Society

== E ==
- Eastern Sociological Society
- Ethiopian Society of Sociologists
- European Association for Sociology of Sport
- European Society of Health and Medical Sociology
- European Society for Rural Sociology
- European Sociological Association

== G ==
- German Association for Law and Society, founded in 1976 as Association for Sociology of Law
- German Sociological Association - ((in German) Deutsche Gesellschaft für Soziologie, DGS)
- Great Plains Sociological Association

== H ==
- Hawaii Sociological Association
- Hong Kong Sociological Association

== I ==
- Illinois Sociological Association
- Indian Medical Sociology Association
- Indian Sociological Society
- International Institute of Sociology
- International Rural Sociology Association
- International Society for the Sociology of Religion
- International Sociological Association
- International Visual Sociology Association
- Iowa Sociological Association
- Iranian Sociological Association

== J ==
- Japan Sociological Society (JSS)

== K ==
- Korean Sociological Association (South Korea)

== L ==
- Latin American Sociological Association (ALAS)

== M ==
- Michigan Sociological Association (MSA)
- Mid-South Sociological Association (MSS)
- Midwest Sociological Society
- Missouri Sociological Association

== N ==
- New England Sociological Association
- New York State Sociological Association
- Nordic Sociological Association
- North American Society for the Sociology of Sport
- North Carolina Sociological Association
- North Central Sociological Association
- North West Indian Sociological Association

== O ==
- Oñati International Institute for the Sociology of Law

== P ==
- Pacific Sociological Association
- Philippine Sociological Society
- Polish Sociological Association (Polskie Towarzystwo Socjologiczne, PTS)
- Portuguese Sociological Association (Associação Portuguesa de Sociologia, APS)

== R ==
- Rural Sociological Society
- Russian Sociological Society

== S ==
- Society for the Study of Social Problems
- Sociological Association of Aotearoa (New Zealand)
- Sociological Association of Ireland
- Sociological Association of Pakistan
- Sociological Association of Turkey
- Sociological Association of Ukraine
- Sociological Research Association
- Sociologists for Women in Society
- Sociology of Education Association
- South African Sociological Association
- Southern Rural Sociological Society
- Southern Sociological Society (SSS)
- Southwestern Sociological Association

== T ==
- Taiwanese Sociological Association
- Turkish Social Science Association
- Turkish Sociological Association

== U ==
- Uganda Sociological and Anthropological Association

== W ==
- Wisconsin Sociological Association

== See also ==
- Society for the Study of Social Problems (SSSP)
- Society for the Scientific Study of Religion
