= Luc Pauwels =

Belgian political scientist (born 1957)

- Born: 1957 (age 68–69); Belgium
- Education: University of Antwerp
- Scientific career
- Fields: sociologist, communication, visual sociologists

Luc Maria Alfons Pauwels (born 1957) is a Belgian visual sociologist and communication scientist, Professor of Communication Studies at the University of Antwerp, Belgium, and director of its Visual and Digital Cultures Research Center (ViDi). He is known for his work on visual research methods.

== Biography ==
Pauwels obtained his degrees in sociology, communication science and philosophy at the University of Antwerp and the Katholieke Universiteit Leuven in the 1970s and 1980s. In 1991 he obtained his PhD in Social and Cultural Sciences at the VU University Amsterdam with the thesis, entitled "Visuele sociologie? : de camera en de verbeelding van de wetenschap en de samenleving" (Visual sociology? : The camera and the imagination of science and society).

After graduation Pauwels started his academic career as associate professor in communication science at the University of Antwerp, Department of Political and Social Sciences, and was lecturer at the Maastricht University. In the new millennium Pauwels was appointed professor at the Department of Communication Studies at the University of Antwerp, Belgium. In Antwerp he also directs the Visual and Digital Cultures Research Center (ViDi).

At the International Communication Association (ICA) Pauwels has been chair of the Visual Communication Studies Division, has been vice president of the International Visual Sociology Association (IVSA), and served on the board of the International Visual Literacy Association (IVLA). Pauwels has also served on the editorial board of the journals Visual Studies from Routledge, Visual Communication from Sage Publications, and the Journal of Visual Literacy (IVLA).

== Work ==
Pauwels research interests are in the fields of "visual sociological research methods, film and image analysis, media analysis, analysis/evaluation of film policy, media historic research of exploitation and media reception." He came into prominence in the late 1990s for his research into "the specifics and the potential of camera-generated images as data (not merely illustration) for anthropological and sociological research."

Pauwels is particularly focussed on contemporary scientific data gathering and scholarly communications, and investigates the impact of traditional visual representational means and new media technologies on its practices. In his early work he started designing research methodologies and typologies of visual social science, and over the years developed these into three specific conceptual frameworks for visual social science.

=== Visual sociology ===
Pauwels is among the foremost visual sociologists, who have been "interested in improving visual research methods and committed to broadening and strengthening empirical social science." Seminal work in the field has been done by Howard S. Becker since the 1970s. According to Harper (1986):

Becker related the emerging visual sociology to the ongoing projects of documentarians, reaching back for roots through the work of Robert Frank, the FSA, and the early reformers like Hine and Riis. Becker also analyzed several methodological questions such as sampling, reliability, validity, and the role of theory in visual research.

Other seminal contributions came from Richard Chalfen (1987), who brought forward an anthropologist's perspective, John Grady (1996), who reflected on "the scope of visual sociology," Doug Harper (2000), who wrote on reflected on "reimagining visual methods.", and Pauwels (2000), who promoted the concept of "visual scientific literacy." Grady (2007) recalled Pauwels contribution as follows:

Finally, Pauwels (2000) states that visual sociologists should develop “visual scientific literacy” to fully exploit the research opportunities that the wide range of visual materials and visual methods make possible. Becoming fluent in visual materials requires several competencies, including a detailed knowledge of how the materials were produced, the bodies of knowledge that study what the materials refer to, and the most accurate and effective ways to communicate visual materials.

With these contributions visual sociology was developed into the new millennium into "a broad continuum of interests and applications premised on diverse theoretical foundations, a wide array of research programs, and a varied commitment to sociology as a discipline."

=== Visual and cultural expressions of websites, 2005 ===
In 2007 Grady characterized the World Wide Web as "a vast bazaar of retailers, fan clubs, family gatherings, and porn sites—to mention some of the most popular venues—which are connected to other sites by explicit links or the insatiable appetite of browsers to devour whatever their search engines might ensnare." In his 2005 article "Websites as visual and multimodal cultural expressions" Pauwels had already detected a growing interest in the scientific research in the web as research object:

The internet is being discovered as a rich resource for researchers in many respects: as a field of study, a research tool and a means for scholarly communication. Several authors have dealt with the implications of transferring established research methods (survey, focus groups, content analysis, interviewing) to online mode, or with the question of how to take advantage of new practices of web users (e.g. chatting) for studying culture... Yet the efforts of researchers to take advantage of the web in each of the indicated areas are not commensurate with the rapid expansion and impact of the online environment on so many aspects of a globalizing society.

In his study Pauwels concluded that "while the Web forms both a unique subject and tool for cultural research... serious methodological problems still need to be overcome before these promising prospects can be realized to their full extent. These problems have to do with getting to know the Web population, and how they relate to the rest of the off-line world, and with developing adequate research tools to disclose the varied verbal and visual nature of the Web."

=== Conceptual frameworks for visual social science ===
Over the years Pauwels developed three specific conceptual frameworks for three distinct domains of visual social science:

- A Conceptual Framework for Analyzing and Producing Visual Representations in Science
- The Integrated Framework for Visual Social Research, and
- The Multimodal Framework for Analyzing Web Phenomena

These frameworks have been applied by Pauwels and others in various areas ranging from research into private image production such as family photography, organizational culture and symbolism, Internet phenomena and advertising, and health promotion in South Africa, to the conceptualisation of urban culture, and globalization.

== Selected publications ==
- Pauwels, Luc, ed. Visual cultures of science: rethinking representational practices in knowledge building and science communication. UPNE, 2006.
- Margolis, Eric, and Luc Pauwels, eds. The Sage handbook of visual research methods. Sage, 2011.
- Pauwels, L. (2015) Reframing Visual Social Science: Towards a More Visual Sociology and Anthropology. Cambridge: Cambridge University Press

Articles, a selection:

- Pauwels, Luc. "Managing impressions On visually decoding the workplace as a symbolic environment." Visual Studies 11.2 (1996): 62–74.
- Pauwels, Luc. "Taking the Visual Turn in Research in Scholarly Communication." Visual Sociology 15.1–2 (2000): 7–14
- Pauwels, Luc. "Websites as visual and multimodal cultural expressions: opportunities and issues of online hybrid media research." Media, Culture & Society 27.4 (2005): 604–613.
- Pauwels, Luc. "A theoretical framework for assessing visual representational practices in knowledge building and science communications." Visual cultures of science: Rethinking representational practices in knowledge building and science communication (2006): 1-25.
- Pauwels, Luc. "Visual sociology reframed: An analytical synthesis and discussion of visual methods in social and cultural research." Sociological Methods & Research 38.4 (2010): 545–581.
- Pauwels, Luc. "A multimodal framework for analyzing websites as cultural expressions." Journal of Computer‐Mediated Communication 17.3 (2012): 247–265.
- Pauwels, Luc. "Conceptualising the'Visual Essay'as a Way of Generating and Imparting Sociological Insight: Issues, Formats and Realisations," Sociological Research Online 17.1 (2012): 1.
- Pauwels, L. (2014) "World cities reframed: a visual take on globalization," Visual Communication, 13(3), August 2014, pp. 389–402
- Pauwels, L. (2015) "Participatory Visual Research Revisited: A critical-constructive assessment of epistemological, methodological and social activist tenets." Ethnography, Vol. 16(1) 95–117, Sage.
