= Mary Romero =

American sociologist (born 1952)

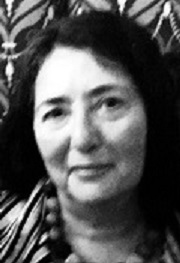
- Romero in 2017
- Born: Nov 12, 1952 (age 73); Denver, Colorado, United States
- Education: University of Colorado Boulder
- Known for: 110th President of the American Sociological Association
- Spouse: Eric Margolis
- Awards: Julian Samora Distinguished Career Award, ASA Latina/o Section (2012); Founder's Award, ASA Section on Racial and Ethnic Minorities (2009); Lee Founders Award, Society for the Study of Social Problems (2004)
- Scientific career
- Workplaces: Arizona State University (1995-present); University of Oregon (1991-1995); San Francisco State University (1989-1991); Yale University (1985-1989); University of Wisconsin-Parkside (1981-1985)

Mary Romero (born 1952) is an American sociologist. She is Professor of Justice Studies and Social Inquiry at Arizona State University, with affiliations in African and African American Studies, Women and Gender Studies, and Asian Pacific American Studies. Before her arrival at ASU in 1995, she taught at University of Oregon, San Francisco State University, and University of Wisconsin–Parkside. Professor Romero holds a bachelor's degree in sociology with a minor in Spanish from Regis College in Denver, Colorado. She holds a PhD in sociology from the University of Colorado Boulder. In 2019, she served as the 110th President of the American Sociological Association.

Romero has received numerous honors and awards for her creative and scholarly works and her commitment to social justice and activism. She is a former Carnegie Scholar, she was awarded the Lee Founders Award (2004) from the Society for the Study of Social Problems in recognition of her scholarship and social justice activism. In 2009, she received the Founders Award from the American Sociological Association's Section on Racial and Ethnic Minorities. In 2012, she was awarded the Julian Samora Distinguished Career Award from the American Sociological Association's Section on Latina/o Sociology.

Using an intersectional lens and feminist legal framework, much of her research program centers on the study of reproductive labor, care-giving, and social inequality in the United States and abroad. More recently, her research has focused on questions of anti-immigrant sentiment and the rise of nationalism and racism against immigrants in the United States, rooted in structural oppression across race, gender, and citizenship.

== Early life ==
Romero was born on November 12, 1952, in Denver, Colorado, United States. She traces her ancestry to a Mestizo Mulatto indigenous Mexican-origin population who first arrived in New Mexico in the 1600s. Her parents were among the first to leave Mora County in Northern New Mexico following World War II. They moved to Denver, Colorado for the promise of work in new factories. Romero is a middle child of six children. Her mother worked as a domestic, cleaning houses, while her father worked at the Gates Rubber factory. Romero was the first child in her family born in a hospital, the first child to speak English as her first language, and was the first child in her family to attend college.

== Education ==
She began college at the University of Colorado Denver and soon transferred to Regis University, a private Jesuit college in Denver.

After graduate school in 1980, Romero worked for one year as a lecturer at the University of Texas at El Paso. She accepted a tenure-track position at the University of Wisconsin–Parkside, where she was an assistant professor. After four years, she left UW-Parkside to take the position of assistant dean at Yale College, where she also lectured in the Women's Studies and Sociology departments from 1985 to 1989. In 1989, after a two-year Presidential Fellowship at the University of California, she accepted the position of Associate Professor and Department Chair of La Raza Studies at San Francisco State University.

She went on to work at the University of Oregon, with visiting professorships at Macalester College and Colgate University. In 1995, she was appointed Professor of Chicana and Chicano Studies (now in the School of Transborder Studies) at Arizona State, and in 1997 moved her position to the School of Social Transformation, where she continues to work as of September 2019.

== Creative and scholarly works ==
=== Books ===
Romero's contributions to the sociological canon began with Maid in the U.S.A., but since the publication of that work she has continued a prolific scholarly career. She is the author of Introducing Intersectionality (Polity, 2017), and the award-winning book, The Maid's Daughter, the 2012 Americo Paredes Book Award Winner and 2012 Outstanding Title by AAUP University Press Books. She is the co-editor of Intersectionality and Entrepreneurship (Routledge 2019), Blackwell Companion to Social Inequalities (Blackwell 2005), Latino/a Popular Culture (New York University Press 2002), Women’s Untold Stories: Breaking Silence, Talking Back, Voicing Complexity (Routledge, 1999), [ Challenging Fronteras: Structuring Latina and Latina Lives in the U.S. (Routledge, 1997), and Women and Work: Exploring Race, Ethnicity and Class (Sage, 1997).She has also published dozens of peer-reviewed articles in social science journals and law reviews. Professor Romero was among the first sociologists to use critical race theory and LatCrit theory in the study of sociology.

=== Selected articles ===
==== Law reviews ====
- "Are Your Papers in Order? Racial Profiling, Vigilantes and 'America's Toughest Sheriff'," Harvard Latino Law Review, 14: pages 337–357 (2011).
- "Keeping Citizenship Rights White: Arizona's Racial Profiling Practices in Immigration Law Enforcement," Law Journal for Social Justice, 1 (1): pages 97–113 (2011).
- Go After the Women": Mothers Against Illegal Aliens' (MAIA) Campaign Against Mexican Immigrant Women and their Children," Symposium Latinos and Latinas at the Epicenter of Contemporary Legal Discourses, Indiana Law Journal, 83 (4): pages 1355–1389 (2008).
- "Class Struggle and Resistance Against the Transformation of Land Ownership and Usage in Northern New Mexico: The Case of Las Gorras Blancas," La Raza and the UCLA Chicano/Latino Law Review 26 : pages 87–110 (2007).
- "Revisiting Outcrits with a Sociological Imagination," Villanova Law Review 50 (3): pages 925–938 (2005).
- "Violation of Latino Civil Rights Resulting From INS and Local Police’s Use of Race, Culture and Class Profiling: The Case of the Chandler Roundup in Arizona," with Marwah Serag, Cleveland State Law Review, 52 (1&2): pages 75–96 (2005).
- "Nanny Diaries and Other Stories: Imagining Women’s Labor in the Social Reproduction of American Families," DePaul Law Review 52 (3): pages 809–847 (2003).
- "State Violence, and the Social and Legal Construction of Latino Criminality: From El Bandido to Gang Member," Denver University Law Review 78 (2): pages 1089–1127 (2001).
- "Unraveling Privilege: Workers' Children and the Hidden Costs of Paid Child Care," Symposium on The Structures of Care Work Chicago-Kent Law Review 76 (3): pages 101–121 (2001).
- "Afterword, Historicizing and Symbolizing a Racial Ethnic Identity: Lessons for Coalition Building with a Social Justice Agenda," University of California, Davis Law Review, 33 (4): pages 1599–1625 (2000).
- "Bursting the Foundational Myths of Reproductive Labor Under Capitalism," Journal of Gender, Social Policy & the Law 8 (1): pages 177–195 (2000).
- "Immigration, The Servant Problem, and the Legacy of the Domestic Labor Debate: 'Where Can You Get Good Help These Days?'" University of Miami Law Review 53 (4): pages 1045–1064 (1999).

==== Social science journals ====
- "Sociology Engaged in Social Justice," American Sociological Review, 85(1), pages 1–30 (2020).
- "Introduction to the special issue: intersectionality and entrepreneurship," with Zulema Valdez, Ethnic and Racial Studies, 39(9): pages 1553–1565 (2016).
- "Nanny diaries and other stories: Immigrant women's labor in the social reproduction of American families," Revista de Estudios Sociales, 45, pages 186–197 (2013).
- "Chicanas Modernize Domestic Service," Domestic Ideology and Domestic Work. de Gruyter, pages 523–538 (2012).
- "Constructing Mexican Immigrant Women as A Threat to US Family," International Journal of Sociology of the Family, 37(1): pages 49–68.(2011).
- "Applications of Critical Race Theory in the US Sociology of Immigration," with Gabriella Sanchez, Sociology Compass, 4(9): pages 770–788 (2010).
- "Ethno-Racial Profiling and State Violence in a Southwest Barrio," with Pat Rubio Goldsmith, Raquel Rubio Goldsmith, Manuel Escobedo, and Laura Khoury, Aztlán: A Journal of Chicano Studies, 34 (1): pages 93–123 (2009). Winner of the 2009 Best Paper Award by the Latino Studies Section of the Latin American Studies Association.
- "The Inclusion of Citizenship Status in Intersectionality: What immigration raids tells us about Mixed-Status Families, the State and Assimilation," International Journal of Sociology of the Family, 34 (2): pages 131–152 (2008).
- "Crossing the Immigration and Race Border: A Critical Race Theory Approach to Immigration Studies," Contemporary Justice Review 11 (1) pages 23–37 (2008).
- "Racial Profiling and Immigration Law Enforcement: Rounding Up of Usual Suspects in the Latino Community," Critical Sociology, 32 (2–3): pages 449–475 (2006).
- "Disciplining the Feminist Bodies of Knowledge: Are We Creating or Reproducing Academic Structure?" NWSA Journal 12 (2): pages 148–162 (2000).
- "Marking Time and Progress," Millennial Special Issue. Signs, Journal of Women in Culture and Society, 25 (4): pages 1013–16 (2000).
- "Integrating Sociology: Observations on Race and Gender Relations in Sociology Graduate Programs," with Eric Margolis, Race and Society, 2 (1): pages 1–24 (1999).
- "'The Department is Very Male, Very White, Very Old, and Very Conservative': The Functioning of the Hidden Curriculum in Graduate Sociology Departments," with Eric Margolis, Harvard Educational Review, 68 (1): pages 1–21 (1998).
- "Class-Based, Gendered and Racialized Institution of Higher Education: Everyday Life of Academia From the View of Chicana Faculty," Race Gender & Class: Latina/o American Voices, 4 (2): pages 151–173 (1997).
- "Cuentos from a Maid's Daughter: Stories of Socialization and Cultural Resistance," Latino Studies Journal, 4 (3): pages 7–18 (1993).
- "Not Just Like One of the Family: Chicana Domestics Establishing Professional Relationships With Employers," Feminist Issues, 10 (2): pages 33–41 (1990).
- "Chicanas Modernize Domestic Service," Qualitative Sociology, 11 (4): pages 319–334 (1988).
- "Chicano Discourse About Language Use," Language Problems Language Planning, 12 (2): pages 110–129 (1988).
- "Sisterhood and Domestic Service: Race, Class and Gender in the Mistress-Maid Relationship," Humanity and Society 12 (4): pages 318–346 (1988).
- "Comparison Between Strategies Used on Prisoners of War and Battered Wives," Sex Roles, 13 (9 and 10): pages 537–547 (1985).
- "The Greater Evil: The Role of Radical Unions in the End of Industrial Feudalism," with Eric Margolis, Research in Social Policy: Critical Historical and Contemporary Perspectives, Volume 1, pages 109–144 (1987).
- "El Paso Salt War: Mob Action or Political Struggle," Aztlan International Journal of Chicano Studies Research, 16 (1 and 2): pages 119–143 (1985).
- "Domestic Work in Transition from Rural to Urban Life: A Case of La Chicana," Women's Studies, 13 (3): pages 199–220 (1987).
- "Tending the Beets: Campesinas and the Great Western Sugar Company," with Eric Margolis, Revista Mujeres, 2 (2): pages 17–27 (1985).
