= Douglas Harper =

American sociologist (born 1948)

Douglas A. Harper (born 1948) is an American sociologist and photographer. He is the holder of the Rev. Joseph A. Lauritis, C.S.Sp. Endowed Chair in Teaching with Technology at Duquesne University, a chair funded by a grant from the Mellon Foundation.

== Biography ==
Harper was born in Saint Paul, Minnesota, United States. He earned a B.A. from Macalester College in 1970 and a PhD in sociology from Brandeis University. While doing research for his PhD dissertation about railroad tramps, he rode freight trains for 20,000 miles (32,000 km) in the western United States.

== Career ==
After graduation, Harper wrote a book, Good Company, about railroad tramps.

Harper made extensive use of photo elicitation interviews in his 1987 book, Working Knowledge, a sociological treatment of the rural bricoleur in America. His 2001 publication, Changing Works, applied the same method to the historical reconstruction of cultural memory.

Harper later co-authored books on post-colonial culture in Hong Kong, Italian food culture, and the semiotics of Italian fascism, in which he researched images as method of cross-cultural communication. In 2014, he studied the sociology of public space in the Italian piazza and in the de-industrialized regions of the American Rust Belt.

Harper has taught sociology at SUNY Potsdam, the University of South Florida, and Duquesne University, and as a guest professor at the University of Amsterdam and University of Bologna. He edited the academic journal Visual Studies during its first thirteen years and wrote five works of visual ethnography published by the University of Chicago Press. His Visual Sociology (Routledge 2012) is a comprehensive treatment of the topic.

Harper was co-founder of the International Visual Sociology Association with Leonard M. Henny and others; in 2013 he was elected its president.

He has had many photographic exhibitions in the US and abroad.

== Books ==
- 2014: I Simboli del fascismo nella Roma del XXI secolo, cronache di un' oblio. Douglas Harper, Francesco Mattioli. Aciraele-Roma: Bonnano. ("The symbols of fascism: Reports of an oblivion"). In Press.
- 2012: Visual Sociology. Douglas Harper. London: Routledge.
- 2009: The Italian Way: Food and Social Life. Douglas Harper and Patrizia Faccioli. Chicago: University of Chicago Press.
- 2009: Hong Kong: Migrant Lives, Landscapes, and Journeys. Caroline Knowles and Douglas Harper. Chicago: University of Chicago Press.
- 2006: Good Company: A Tramp Life. Boulder: Paradigm. Douglas Harper. (Revised and expanded third edition).
- 2003: The Cultural Study of Work. Douglas Harper and Helen Lawson, editors. Boulder: Rowman Littlefield. 2004 Outstanding Title, designation by the American Library Association.
- 2001: Changing Works: Visions of a Lost Agriculture. Douglas Harper. University of Chicago Press. Scholarly Achievement Award, North Central Sociological Association and Collier Award, Society for Visual Anthropology.
- 1998: Mondi Da Vedere: Verso una sociologia piu visuale. Patrizia Faccioli and Douglas Harper, editors. Milan: FrancoAngeli.
- 1994: Cape Breton, 1952: The Photographic Vision of Timothy Asch (editor). University of Southern California: Ethnographics Press; International Visual Sociology Association.
- 1993: Eyes Across the Water, vol. II: Essays on Visual Sociology and Anthropology. Robert Boonzajer Flaes and Douglas Harper, editors. Amsterdam: Het Spinhuis Press.
- 1987: Working Knowledge: Skill and Community in a Small Shop. Douglas Harper. University of Chicago Press. Paperback edition, University of California Press, 1992.
- 1982: Good Company. Douglas Harper. University of Chicago Press. Second edition translations: Good Company: Un sociologo tra I vagabondi. Milan: FrancoAngeli, 1999 in Italian; Les Vagabonds du Nord-Ouest Américain. Paris: L'Harmattan, 1998 in French.

== Films ==
- 2013: The First Step to Recovery. (a 60-minute documentary film, in process.) Douglas Harper and Margaret Patterson, co-directors.
- 1983: Ernie's Sawmill. Douglas Harper and Stephen Papson, co-directors. A 16 mm, 20-minute ethnographic film.
