= Dwanna L. McKay =

American sociologist (1962–2025)

Dwanna Lynn McKay
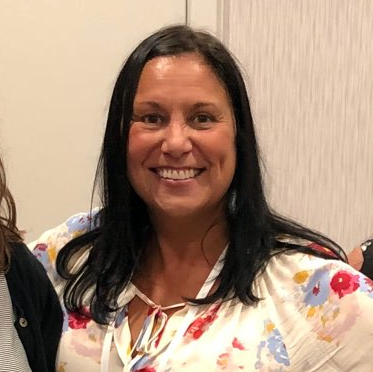
- McKay in 2019
- Born: 25 November 1962
- Died: 11 November 2025 (aged 62)
- Occupation: Associate Professor

Academic background
- Education: University of Central Oklahoma, East Tennessee State University, Oklahoma State University–Stillwater, University of Massachusetts Amherst
- Thesis: Navigating Indigenous Identity (2013)
- Doctoral advisor: Joya Misra

Acting Secretary of the Department of Education and Training for The Muscogee Nation
- In office 2015–2016

Member of the Native American Advisory Committee for the Office of the Governor of Kansas
- In office 2013–2015

Academic work
- Discipline: Sociology
- Sub-discipline: Indigenous Studies
- Institutions: Colorado College

Dwanna Lynn McKay (née Robertson; 25 November 1962 – 11 November 2025) was an American sociologist and Indigenous studies scholar. She was an associate professor and chair of Race, Ethnicity, and Migration Studies at Colorado College. McKay is noted for scholarship on Indigenous identity and for theorizing "legitimized racism" against Indigenous peoples in the United States.

== Education ==
McKay earned a B.A. in political science from the University of Central Oklahoma in 2001 and an M.B.A. in management science from East Tennessee State University in 2003. She received an M.S. in sociology from Oklahoma State University–Stillwater in 2010, and a Ph.D. in sociology from the University of Massachusetts Amherst in 2013; her dissertation was titled Navigating Indigenous Identity. Her doctoral advisor was Joya Misra.

== Career ==
McKay joined Colorado College in 2016 and was associate professor and chair of the Race, Ethnicity, and Migration Studies program. At the college she helped launch the Indigenous Studies thematic minor and worked on land acknowledgment and other reconciliation efforts.

McKay's research and teaching focus on Indigenous identity, critical Indigenous methodologies, critical race theory, and gendered racial processes. Her theoretical contributions include work on "legitimized racism" and on linking race and settler colonialism within U.S. sociology.

With co-authors, Kirsten Vinyeta and Kari Marie Norgaard, McKay connected insufficient theoretical engagement with settler colonialism in American sociology with "the general absence of Indigenous scholars and perspectives within sociology as a whole" and argued that:

To make way for an Indigenous Sociology (for lack of a better term), we must attend to the removal of existing barriers to Indigenous participation within our discipline. In addition to improving literacy on settler colonialism and Indigenous experiences and perspectives among sociologists, it is crucial to make sure the institutions and practices we partake in recognize and account for the value of Indigenous scholars and epistemologies. Just as empires and settlers presumed the North American continent as terra nullius, so too have sociologists largely failed to account for the presence of Indigenous peoples in North America, inevitably leading to the erasure of Indigenous scholars, frameworks, and epistemologies within the discipline.

McKay wrote that during her career she endured "legitimized racism against Native Peoples perpetuated in everyday conversations with students, administrative staff, and other faculty" and that working in higher education involved having to "navigate white supremacy and patriarchy" which she described as "the founding ideologies of the contemporary institution of education in the United States".

In November 2025, The council of the Indigenous Peoples and Native Nations section of the American Sociological Association issued a statement in memory of McKay, stating that she was "a leader in the sociology of Indigenous peoples and Native Nations". The council recognized McKay for having "helped to shape a community within the discipline that foregrounded Indigenous knowledges, methodologies, and lived experiences". The council wrote that "her work pushed sociology to confront the ongoing effects of settler colonialism and racialization, offering new ways to think about identity, racism, and the social forces shaping Indigenous life" and concluded that her "sense of justice and wisdom guided many of us".

=== Legitimized racism ===
McKay noted that in the United States following the passage of the Civil Rights Act, "it became socially unacceptable to express blatant antagonism toward people of color" and therefore, racism tended to operate through covert processes and acts - a position which other theorists such as Eduardo Bonilla-Silva concurred with. McKay argued that "Natives still routinely experience overt racism in the form of racial epithets" and "horribly distorted depictions", explaining that "this overt racism is not confined to hate groups but is visible in everyday discourse and throughout the media". McKay's theory forwarded the idea "that racism against American Indians has been normalized and institutionally legitimized, thereby rendering it invisible", describing this as 'legitimized racism' because "to legitimize is to make legitimate, that is, to justify, reason, or rationalize in accordance with established or accepted patterns and standards". This legitimization process is, according to McKay, perpetuated and maintained through "the institutions that shape social norms—those seen as social authorities—reproduce symbolic racial violence against American Indians through legal structures, public education locations, consumer products, sports associations, and so on".

=== Professional service ===
As a citizen of the Muscogee (Creek) Nation, McKay served as the Nation's Secretary (Acting) of Education and Training (2015–2016). She served on the National Advisory Committee for the Native American Student Advocacy Institute (NASAI) and as vice-chair of the Mvskoke Women's Leadership Institute; she has also served on the Native American Advisory Committee to the Office of the Governor of Kansas and on the planning committee of the Native American Nutrition Conference.

== Personal life ==
McKay was a citizen of the Muscogee (Creek) Nation, and belonged to the Nokvsvlke (Bear clan), just as her mother did. McKay was the youngest of eight children, and grew up in poverty. McKay lived in Henryetta, Oklahoma as a child and attended school there. McKay wrote that as a youth she was "not allowed to walk down the football field with a white boy as part of homecoming court in junior high" due to anti-Indian racism. McKay had a daughter, Dena, when she was 16 years old. McKay wrote that when her daughter was born, she was "overwhelmed by the beauty of her and what her life meant to me and my people". McKay wrote that her "experience as a teenage mother also prepared me for dealing with oppressive regimes". McKay raised her daughter as a single parent and first attended a college course at the age of 25, and continued her education while working full time.

== Publications/works ==
Selected peer-reviewed journal articles

- McKay, Dwanna L. (2021). "Real Indians: Policing or Protecting Authentic Indigenous Identity?" Sociology of Race and Ethnicity 7(1): 12–25. doi:10.1177/2332649218821450.
- McKay, Dwanna L.; Vinyeta, Kirsten; Norgaard, Kari (2020). "Theorizing Race and Settler Colonialism within U.S. Sociology." Sociology Compass 14(9): e12821. doi:10.1111/soc4.12821.
- Robertson, Dwanna L. (2015). "Invisibility in the Color-Blind Era: Examining Legitimized Racism against Indigenous Peoples." The American Indian Quarterly 39(2): 113–152.
- Dixon, Jeffrey C.; Fullerton, Andrew S.; Robertson, Dwanna L. (2013). "Cross-National Differences in Workers' Perceived Job, Labour Market, and Employment Insecurity in Europe: Empirical Tests and Theoretical Extensions." European Sociological Review 29(5): 1053–1067. doi:10.1093/esr/jcs084.
- Fullerton, Andrew S.; Robertson, Dwanna L.; Dixon, Jeffrey C. (2011). "Reexamining the Relationship between Flexibility and Insecurity: A Multilevel Study of Perceived Job Insecurity in 27 European Countries." Research in the Sociology of Work 22: 11–43.

Selected chapters and public scholarship

- McKay, Dwanna L. (2019). "Masking Legitimized Racism: Indigeneity, Colorblindness, and the Sociology of Race." In Kimberlé Crenshaw, Luke Harris, Daniel Martinez HoSang, and George Lipsitz (eds.), Seeing Race Again: Countering Colorblindness across the Disciplines, pp. 85–104. Oakland: University of California Press.
- McKay, Dwanna L. (2022). "Mvskoke Eckvlke (Muscogee Motherhood) in Academic Spaces." In Robin Minthorn, Christine A. Nelson, and Heather J. Shotton (eds.), Indigenous Motherhood in the Academy, pp. 83–91. Rutgers University Press.
- Robertson, Dwanna L. (2013). "A Necessary Evil: Framing an American Indian Legal Identity." American Indian Culture and Research Journal 37(4):115–139.
- McKay, Dwanna L. (2020). "Oklahoma is—and has always been—Native Land." The Conversation (July 16, 2020). Republished by multiple outlets.

== Notability ==
McKay's research and public writing on Indigenous sovereignty and identity, including her widely republished 2020 Conversation essay on the implications of McGirt v. Oklahoma, has received independent coverage and syndication by national outlets such as Yahoo! News. She was invited to speak on Indigenous history and contemporary issues by universities and centers beyond her home institution, including the University of Mississippi's SouthTalks series (2021) and the University of Minnesota (2023).

== Awards and honors ==
- Elder of the Year, Garden of the Gods Rock Ledge Ranch Powwow (2019).
- Lloyd E. Worner Teacher of the Year Award, Colorado College (2019).
- Rochelle T. Mason Award for Outstanding Event Contributing to the Empowerment of Communities of Color, Colorado College (2017).

== See also ==
- Indigenous studies
- Muscogee (Creek) Nation
