= Maureen T. Hallinan =

American sociologist

- Born: June 11, 1940; New York City
- Died: January 28, 2014 (aged 73); South Bend, Indiana
- Scientific career
- Fields: Sociology of education
- Institutions: University of Notre Dame

Maureen T. Hallinan (1940–2014) was an American sociologist and the William P. and Hazel B. White Professor of Sociology at the University of Notre Dame. She conducted research on the sociology of education, and she was the founding director of the Center for Research on Educational Opportunity in the Institute for Educational Initiatives. In 1996, she served as president of the American Sociological Association.

== Biography ==
Hallinan was born in New York City, the daughter of Irish immigrants. She received an undergraduate degree in mathematics from Marymount College, and she was a nun and math teacher at a Catholic high school before attending graduate school. She earned a master's degree from Notre Dame and a doctorate in sociology and education from the University of Chicago. Hallinan separated from her religious order while pursuing her graduate education.

Hallinan was a faculty member at the University of Wisconsin-Madison and Stanford University early in her career. In 1984, Hallinan became the second female to receive a named chair appointment at Notre Dame. She served as the first director of the Center for Research on Educational Opportunity at Notre Dame's Institute for Educational Initiatives. Her research interests included the effects of ability group assignments on student achievement and the formation of cross-race friendships among students. She served as editor of Sociology of Education beginning in the early 1980s.

Hallinan retained her religious faith after leaving her religious order for sociological research, but she criticized what she saw as Notre Dame's push toward mission. In an interview, she said: "They wouldn't use the word proselytizing, but I do think that's part of it. 'How do we teach chemistry from a Christian perspective, from a Catholic perspective?' That kind of thing. Whereas I believe... teaching chemistry and teaching it well is holy."

In 1996, Hallinan was president of the American Sociological Association. Four years later, she served as president of the Sociological Research Association. She was a member of the National Academy of Education, and she was included in the first class of fellows of the American Educational Research Association in 2008.

Hallinan was married to Art Grubert until his death in 2010. She retired from Notre Dame in 2012 and died in 2014.
