= David Cunningham (sociologist) =

American sociologist

- Occupation: Sociologist
- Known for: Research on Ku Klux Klan

Academic background
- Education: University of Connecticut, BA, BS University of North Carolina at Chapel Hill, M.A., Ph.D

Academic work
- Discipline: Sociology
- Sub-discipline: Social movements, white supremacy, race-based hate groups
- Institutions: Washington University in St. Louis; Brandeis University
- Notable works: Klansville, U.S.A.: The Rise and Fall of the Civil Rights-Era Ku Klux Klan
- Website: https://sociology.wustl.edu/people/david-cunningham

David Cunningham is a Professor and Chair of Sociology at Washington University in St. Louis. His scholarship includes social conflict, race-based hate groups, and social movements.

== Education ==
Cunningham studied civil engineering and English at University of Connecticut and graduated in 1993. He received his M.A. in sociology in 1996 and his Ph.D in sociology in 2000 from the University of North Carolina at Chapel Hill. His dissertation was on FBI Counterintelligence programs, which ended social movements that the FBI saw as threats to national security.

== Career ==
Cunningham has written two books: Klansville, U.S.A.: The Rise and Fall of the Civil Rights-Era Ku Klux Klan (2013), which was the basis for the PBS American Experience documentary, Klansville USA, and There’s Something Happening Here: The New Left, the Klan, and FBI Counterintelligence (2004).

From 1999 to 2015, Cunningham was a professor at Brandeis University. From 2008 to 2015, he served as the Chair of the Social Justice and Social Policy program at Brandeis, and from 2012 to 2015, he served as Chair of the Sociology Department. In 2015, he became one of the three inaugural faculty members to reestablish the sociology department in Arts and Sciences at Washington University in St. Louis, along with Adia Harvey Wingfield and Jake Rosenfeld.

He has been featured and interviewed for numerous publications and news sources including: The New York Times, The Washington Post, PBS, CBS News, and NPR.

He is also a prolific writer and reviewer, and he has published dozens of pieces in both academic and news publications, which are frequently on the KKK. Some of these pieces include: his 2016 opinion article in The Washington Post: "Five myths about the Ku Klux Klan"; his co-authored 2014 journal article "Political Polarization as a Social Movement Outcome: 1960s Klan Activism and Its Enduring Impact on Political Realignment in Southern Counties, 1960 to 2000" in the American Sociological Review; and his 2005 article in The Boston Globe: "All the Klan's men".

Cunningham has also served as a consultant in many capacities. He has worked as an academic consultant for WGBH Educational Foundation and Facing History and Ourselves; was a consulting expert for Moore et al. v. Franklin County, MS and Averill et al. v. City of Seattle; and has been a research collaborator for the Civil Rights and Restorative Justice Project at Northeastern University School of Law for over ten years, the Mississippi Truth Project, and the Greensboro Truth and Reconciliation Commission. He also was a consulting expert for the American Civil Liberties Union for two years, providing expert testimony in a case against the Denver Police Department looking at the impact of police surveillance.

== Positions held ==
Cunningham has held various leadership positions in his academic career, including current Chair of the Department of Sociology in Arts and Sciences at Washington University in St. Louis and former Chair of the Department of Sociology at Brandeis University. Since 2016, he has served on the editorial board of the American Sociological Review and since 2018, he has been on the executive board of the Washington University Prison Education Project.

=== Within the American Sociological Association ===
Cunningham has served on several committees and has held several positions within the American Sociological Association. He is currently on the Committee on Professional Ethics (COPE); previously spent four years on the Council for the Section on Peace, War and Social Conflict; and was the Chair of the Gordon Hirabayashi Human Rights Book Award committee within the Section on Human Rights - among several other positions.

He has especially had extensive involvement in the ASA's Section on Collective Behavior & Social Movements. Between 2007 and 2014, he has served on its council, Workshop Committee, Mentoring Committee, Outstanding Article Award Committee, and Mayer Zald Outstanding Graduate Paper Award Committee.

== Awards and honors ==
Cunningham has won numerous awards for his research, writing, and teaching, which include:

- 2019 Robin M. Williams Award for Distinguished Contributions to Scholarship, Teaching, and Service - Peace, War, and Social Conflict Section of the American Sociological Association
- 2015 Best Published Article Award - Section on Collective Behavior and Social Movements of the ASA
- 2007 Jeanette Lerman-Neubauer '69 and Joseph Neubauer Prize for Excellence in Teaching and Mentoring - Brandeis University

=== Klansville, U.S.A. ===
His most recent book, Klansville, U.S.A., has been the recipient of many accolades:

- Outstanding Book Award - American Sociological Association, Peace, War, and Social Conflict Section
- Finalist, C. Wright Mills Award, Society for the Study of Social Problems
- Honorable Mention, Charles Tilly Award for Best Book, ASA Collective Behavior and Social Movements Section
