= Donald Young (sociologist) =

American sociologist (1898–1977)

Donald Ramsey Young
- Born: 5 July 1898; Macungie, Pennsylvania
- Died: 17 April 1977 (aged 78); Macungie, Pennsylvania
- Occupation: Sociologist
- Board member of: President, American Sociological Association
- Spouse: Ada Wise Young

Academic background
- Education: Lafayette College (AB, 1919); University of Pennsylvania (PhD, 1922)
- Thesis: Motion pictures; a study in social legislation (1922)

Donald Ramsey Young (5 July 1898 – 17 April 1977) was an American sociologist, and the former president of each of the American Sociological Association, the Russell Sage Foundation, and the Social Science Research Council.

== Education ==
Young completed his undergraduate studies at Lafayette College in 1919. Young continued his education with a master's degree then PhD from the University of Pennsylvania, completing his doctorate in 1922. At the University of Pennsylvania, Young was taught by James P. Lichtenberger, the twelfth President of the American Sociological Association. Following his doctoral training, Young completed postdoctoral positions at Rutgers University, Princeton University, and the University of Pennsylvania. In 1922, Young published a revised version of his doctoral thesis as Motion Pictures: A Study in Social Legislation.

== Career ==
Young was first an assistant instructor and then eventually a full professor at the University of Pennsylvania, where he also became the chair of the university's sociology department. Young stayed affiliated with the University of Pennsylvania until 1947.

Young worked for the Social Science Research Council in New York, initially as a research secretary, and then eventually as executive director and President. During the Second World War, Young was a consultant to the Joint Army and Navy Committee on Welfare and Recreation from 1942 until 1945. Young was appointed as the General Director (later retitled to 'President') of the Russell Sage Foundation in 1948, where he continued working until 1968. Young worked as a professor at Rockefeller University from 1964 until 1969. Young then worked as an executive consultant for the João Pinheiro Foundation in Brazil.

In 1960, during its business meeting, the American Sociological Association passed a resolution to express "its appreciation to Dr. Donald R. Young for his outstanding dedication to American sociology in numerous capacities over the years".

== Personal life and death ==
Young was born in Macungie, a suburb of Allentown, Pennsylvania. Young learned Pennsylvania Dutch as a child, and would converse with his neighbors in the language. Young married Ada Wise Young (1901–1999), with whom he had two children: May Young Swagert and Robert K. Young. Young died on April 17, 1977, in Allentown, Pennsylvania, at the Sacred Heart Hospital. In an obituary published in Footnotes, the American Sociological Association's member magazine, Wilbert E. Moore (the 56th ASA president) described Young as "the wisest man I have ever known".

== Select works ==
- Young, D. R. (1922). Motion pictures: a study in social legislation (Vol. 17). Westbrook Publishing Company.
- Young, D. R. (1932). American minority peoples: A study in racial and cultural conflicts in the United States. Harper.
- Young, D. R. (1937). Minority Peoples in the Depression. Arno Press.
- Young, D. (1955). Sociology and the practicing professions. American Sociological Review, 20(6), 641–648.
- Young, D., & Moore, W. E. (1969). Trusteeship and the Management of Foundations. Russell Sage Foundation.
