= International Visual Sociology Association =

The International Visual Sociology Association (IVSA) is an international association for "visual sociology, visual studies, visual ethnography, documentary film and photography, public art, arts-based research, and visual literacy and education." The association holds annual conferences and publishes the journal, Visual Studies.

The IVSA was established in 1981 by Leonard M. Henny (1935-2011), Douglas Harper, and others to "foster a community of visual driven thinkers.". Other notable scientists, who served as (vice) president are John Gardy, Luc Pauwels and Eric Margolis. The association holds an annual IVSA International Conference since 1983. It the early days it published the review International Journal of Visual Sociology, in five issues, which were edited by Leonard M. Henny.

Because of the interests of its founders, the IVSA tends to be concerned with photography and documentary filmmaking within a sociological context. However, visual sociology - theoretically at least - includes the study of all kinds of visual material and the visual social world, and uses all kinds of visual material in its methodologies.

Similarly, the newly formed British Sociological Association Visual Sociology Study Group offers UK-based researchers and academics working in a broad range of sub-disciplines within sociological fields, a network in which to explore existing and emerging visual research methods and methodologies.
