= Stanley Lieberson =

American sociologist (1933–2018)

Stanley Lieberson (April 20, 1933 – March 19, 2018) was an American sociologist.

Born in Montreal, Quebec, Canada, Lieberson was raised in Brooklyn and graduated from Abraham Lincoln High School before attending Brooklyn College. Lieberson completed graduate study at the University of Chicago. He taught at the University of Washington from 1967 to 1971, then joined Harvard University as the Abbott Lawrence Lowell Research Professor of Sociology. Over the course of his career, Lieberson was awarded a Guggenheim Fellowship, named a member of the National Academy of Sciences and the American Philosophical Society, granted fellowship to the American Academy of Arts and Sciences, and served the American Sociological Association as its president. He died on March 19, 2018. Volume 49 of the journal Sociological Methodology, published in 2019, was dedicated to Lieberson.

== Selected books ==
- Lieberson, Stanley (2000). A Matter of Taste: How Names, Fashions, and Culture Change. Yale University Press. ISBN 9780300083859.
- Lieberson, Stanley; Waters, Mary C. (1988). From Many Strands: Ethnic and Racial Groups in Contemporary America. Russell Sage Foundation. ISBN 9780871545435.
- Lieberson, Stanley (1985). Making It Count: The Improvement of Social Research and Theory. University of California Press. ISBN 9780520053502.
- Lieberson, Stanley (1980). A Piece of the Pie: Blacks and White Immigrants Since 1880. University of California Press. ISBN 9780520041233.
- Lieberson, Stanley (1970). Language and Ethnic Relations in Canada. John Wiley and Sons. ISBN 9780471534211.
