= Eric Margolis =

Eric Margolis may refer to:

- Eric Margolis (journalist) (born 1943), American journalist
- Eric Margolis (sociologist) (born 1947), American sociologist
