= John Grady (sociologist) =

American sociologist

- Born: John Marshall Grady

Academic background
- Education: Boston College (AB); Yale University (AM); Brandeis University (PhD)

Academic work
- Discipline: Sociology
- Sub-discipline: Visual sociology
- Institutions: Wheaton College

John Marshall Grady (born 1942) is an American sociologist and emeritus professor of sociology at Wheaton College, known for his seminal work in the field of visual sociology.

== Education ==
Grady earned an A.B. in English and Asian studies from Boston College in 1964, an A.M. in anthropology from Yale University 1967, and a Ph.D. in sociology from Brandeis University 1977.

== Career ==
After earning his PhD, Grady was hired by Wheaton College in Norton MA and appointed professor of sociology in 1990. He occupied the Hannah Goldberg Chair at Wheaton College from 1994 to 2004, and the William Isaac Cole Professor of Sociology from 2010 to 2015. He also served as president of the International Visual Sociology Association (IVSA). His research interests focuses on social organization in daily life and the "use of visual imagery in social research and analysis; and making documentary films." He is currently an editor of Visual Studies, the journal of the International Visual Sociology Association.

== Selected publications ==
- Grady, John. "The visual essay and sociology 1." Visual Studies 6.2 (1991): 23–38.
- Grady, John. "The scope of visual sociology." Visual Studies, 11.2 (1996): 10–24.
- Grady, John. "Becoming a visual sociologist." Sociological Imagination 38.1/2 (2001): 83–119.
- Grady, John. "Edward Tufte and the promise of a visual social science." Visual cultures of science: Rethinking representational practices in knowledge building and science communication (2006): 222–65.
- Grady, John. "Visual sociology." 21st century sociology: A reference handbook (2007): 63–70.
- Grady, John. "Visual research at the crossroads." Forum Qualitative Sozialforschung/Forum: Qualitative Social Research. Vol. 9. No. 3. 2008.
