= William Goode (sociologist) =

American sociologist

William J. Goode
- Born: August 30, 1917; Houston, Texas, U.S.
- Died: May 4, 2003 (aged 85); Washington, D.C., U.S.
- Occupation: Sociologist
- Title: Franklin H. Giddings Professor of Sociology
- Board member of: American Sociological Association
- Spouse: Lenore J. Weitzman
- Awards: Honorary Doctorate of Science, Upsala College (1971); Merit Award for a Lifetime of Scholarship (Eastern Sociological Association); National Institute of Mental Health Senior Scientist Career Award; MacIver Prize for the best scholarly book; two Guggenheim Fellowships.

Academic background
- Education: Rice University (expelled); University of Texas, Austin (BA, MA); Pennsylvania State University (PhD)
- Doctoral advisor: Wilbert E. Moore

Academic work
- Discipline: Sociology
- Institutions: Wayne State University; Columbia University, George Mason University, Stanford University, Harvard University
- Notable works: World Revolution and Family Patterns (1963), The Celebration of Heroes (1978), World Changes in Divorce Patterns (1993)

William Josiah Goode (August 30, 1917 – May 4, 2003) was an American sociologist and the 63rd President of the American Sociological Association. Goode worked on the cross-cultural study of marriage and divorce, in addition to other work concerning prestige, social control, and love. Goode's most known work was his 1963 text World Revolution and Family Patterns. Goode was a recipient, on two occasions, of a Guggenheim Fellowship. Goode was also a fellow of the American Academy of Arts and Sciences.

== Life and career ==
On August 30, 1917, Goode was born in Houston, Texas. At high school, his debating coach was Lyndon B. Johnson. Goode won a full fellowship to study at Rice University, but was later expelled for violating the dress code. Goode later gained both a BA (1938) and MA (1939) from the University of Texas, Austin. Goode studied for a PhD in sociology at Pennsylvania State University and joined the navy to work as a radarman in the Pacific theatre of the Second World War. Goode received his PhD in 1946.

Following the end of the Second World War, Goode joined Wayne State University as an assistant professor and worked there from 1946 until 1950. Goode began working at Columbia University in 1950, collaborating there with Robert K. Merton on work concerning professions. Goode was promoted to associate professor in 1952, then became a full Professor of Sociology in 1956. Goode became the Franklin H. Giddings Professor of Sociology in 1975. Goode was the chair of the department of sociology on various occasions in the 1960s and 1970s.

After Columbia, Goode joined Stanford University as a professor of sociology, where he became an emeritus Professor in 1986. Goode became part of Harvard University's Department of Sociology, where he stayed until 1993. He was also affiliated to George Mason University's Department of Sociology in 1994. In 1991 and 1992 he was a visiting professor at Hebrew University of Jerusalem.

According to Brian Q.Flannery, Goode made his greatest contributions to middle-range theory and the combining of different research methods. Goode's work was characterised by the mixed application of sociological and anthropological approaches, and Flannery praised his work as "accessible to the very people he studied".

=== World Revolution and Family Patterns ===
In 1963, Goode's World Revolution and Family Patterns was published by The Free Press of Glencoe. The book relied on data spanning multiple decades and including more than fifty countries. According to Brian Q. Flannery, the work became Goode's "most widely recognized research". The book was well received at the time of its publication. In a review for Social Forces N. B. Ryder described the book as "the book of the year in sociology" and asserted that "nobody of stature in sociology will ignore this work". However, Ryder critiqued the book for giving insufficient attention to the relationship between family structure and mortality. Over time, the book proved to be highly influential in the field of family scholarship. According to Joan Aldous, the book "widened the research horizons of family sociologists and helped legitimize family sociology as an area of scholarship".

Goode's primary thesis, that "owing to industrialization, family patterns around the world would come to resemble the mid-twentieth-century Western conjugal family", proved to be "incorrect" according to Andrew J. Cherlin's later assessment fifty years following the book's publication.

=== World Changes in Divorce Patterns ===
In 1993, Goode's World Changes in Divorce Patterns was published by Yale University Press. The text represented Goode's effort to describe and explain global divorce dynamics through an "eclectic, comparative worldwide approach". Reviewing the book in Population and Development Review, Gavin W. Jones remarked that while it "enriches our appreciation of the widely divergent trends in divorce and the complexity of situations in different parts of the world, it does not take us very far in reaching a general theory of divorce". Reviewing the book for Social Forces, Frances Goldscheider remarked that "Goode has given us a treasure".

=== The Celebration of Heroes ===
In 1978, the University of California Press published Goode's The Celebration of Heroes: Prestige as a Social Control System. The Celebration of Heroes was the book "of which he was proudest" and represented "a keystone to his overarching analysis of the subtleties of social forces involved in the production and distribution of prestige, honor, and respect". The book was described by Robert K. Merton as "Sociological analysis at its imaginative best. A truly virtuoso performance." Marie Marschall Fuller, writing in Social Science Quarterley, called the book "probably the first extensive treatise on prestige as a social control system influencing large-scale organizations and agencies as well as small-group interaction". Fuller praised it as "a beautiful book composed with intelligence, logic, insight, and a delightful writing style". Reviewing the book in the Journal of Social History, Raymond Grew suggested that The Celebration of Heroes "reflected a painful loss of optimism familiar in contemporary America", elaborating "no reader, now or later, is likely to doubt that this book was written by an American sociologist in the period after World War II". Grew praised Goode's writing style and evident knowledge of the topic but criticized the book by stating that "this study remains fundamentally uncomparative because the social context from which examples are taken is never more than thinly sketched".

=== Personal life and death ===
Goode was married to Lenore J. Weitzman, a professor of sociology and law at George Mason University, at the time of his death. Goode had one sister, Rosalie Grizzle. Goode's previous two marriages, to Josephine Cannizzo and Ruth Rosenbaum, both resulted in divorce. Goode is survived by three children: Erich (son of Josephine), Barbara, and Andrew. Erich also went on to be a professor of sociology.

Goode died of an abdominal blood clot at George Washington University Hospital on May 4, 2003. His funeral was held at the Columbarium of Arlington National Cemetery. In an obituary, Goode was remembered as someone who "encouraged and promoted the careers of his women graduate students" and "an early supporter of the nascent women’s movement, both intellectually and personally". The William J. Goode International Fellowship was established in memory of Goode.

== Selected works ==
=== Articles ===
- Goode, W. J. (1957). Community within a community: The professions. American sociological review, 22(2), 194–200.
- Goode, W. J. (1959). The theoretical importance of love. American Sociological Review, 38–47.
- Goode, W. J. (1971). "Force and Violence in the Family". Journal of Marriage and the Family: 624–636.

=== Books ===
- Goode, W. J. (1963). World Revolution and Family Patterns. The Free Press of Glencoe.
- Goode, W. J. (1965). Women in Divorce. Free Press.
- Goode, W. J. (1978). The Celebration of Heroes: Prestige as a Social Control System. University of California Press.
- Goode, W. J. (1993). World Changes in Divorce Patterns. Yale University Press.
