= John L. Gillin =

American sociologist (1871–1958)

- Born: 12 October 1871; Hudson, Iowa, United States
- Died: 8 December 1958 (aged 87); Madison, Wisconsin, United States

Academic background
- Education: Upper Iowa University; Grinnell College; Columbia University

Academic work
- Discipline: Sociology
- Institutions: University of Wisconsin

John Lewis Gillin (12 October 1871 – 8 December 1958) was an American sociologist, specializing in applied sociology, and the 16th president of the American Sociological Association (in 1926). He was also active in the activities of the American Red Cross.

He was born in Hudson, Iowa.

He held positions as a professor of social sciences in the Iowa University (1907–1912) and then University of Wisconsin (1912–1958).

In 1915, he co-authored, with Frank Wilson Blackmar, Outlines of sociology, described as "the first widely used introductory text" on sociology.

He was the father of John Philip Gillin, an anthropologist.

== Works ==
- Outlines of sociology, 1915 (with Frank Wilson Blackmar)
- Poverty and dependency. Their relief and prevention, 1926
- Criminology and Penology, 1926
- Introduction to Sociology, 1942 (with John P. Gillin)
- Cultural Sociology, 1948 (with John P. Gillin)
