= Adia Harvey Wingfield =

21st-century American sociologist

- Known for: Research on race's impact on professionals and racializing the glass escalator
- Awards: 2018 Public Understanding of Sociology Award from the American Sociological Association

Academic background
- Education: Johns Hopkins University (M.A., Ph.D); Spelman College (B.A.)

Academic work
- Discipline: Sociology
- Institutions: Washington University in St. Louis; Georgia State University; Hollins University
- Website: sociology.wustl.edu/people/adia-harvey-wingfield

Adia Harvey Wingfield is a professor of sociology at Washington University in St. Louis and the 2018 President of Sociologists for Women in Society. She is the author of several books, including No More Invisible Man: Race and Gender in Men's Work, and articles in peer-reviewed journals including Social Problems, Gender & Society, and Ethnic and Racial Studies. She has lectured internationally on her research.

== Biography ==
Adia Harvey Wingfield is Professor of Sociology and a Faculty Fellow in the Office of the Provost at Washington University in St. Louis, where her research interests are in the persistence of intersectional racial and gender inequalities in professional occupations, in particular the challenges facing black men in workplaces where they are in the minority.

She attended Spelman College as an undergraduate, studying English. Wingfield received her M.A. and Ph.D. in sociology from Johns Hopkins University.

After receiving her Ph.D., she served as an assistant professor of sociology at Hollins University from 2004 to 2006. In 2006, she joined the sociology department at Georgia State University, where she served as an assistant professor of sociology until 2012. In 2011, she was a visiting professor of sociology at Rikkyo University in Tokyo, Japan. In 2012, she received tenure and became an associate professor of sociology at Georgia State. In 2015, Wingfield moved to St. Louis to become one of three professors that re-established the sociology department at Washington University in St. Louis, along with David Cunningham, Ku Klux Klan scholar and former chair of the sociology department at Brandeis University, and Jake Rosenfeld, scholar on labor and unions and former sociology professor at University of Washington.

== Leadership ==
In 2018, Wingfield served as President of Sociologists for Women in Society a national organization that encourages feminist research and teaching in sociology.

She served as the President of the Southern Sociological Society from 2020 to 2021.

She is a founding member of the Sociology Action Network Advisory Board and is serving from 2018 to 2020 as a member of the American Sociological Association Program Committee.

== Books ==
- Flatlining: Race, Work, and Health Care in the New Economy (2019) looks at the role of African American health care workers and the inequality they face in the workplace.
- No More Invisible Man: Race and Gender in Men's Work (2013) examines the unique experiences of black men when employed in white male-dominated professional jobs, for example as lawyers, doctors, engineers, or bankers.
- Yes We Can? White Racial Framing and the Obama Presidency, 2nd edition (2012) with Joe Feagin further analyzes Obama, focusing on his presidency and second campaign.
- Changing Times for Black Professionals (2011) analyzes the "challenges, issues, and obstacles facing black professional workers in the United States."
- Yes We Can? White Racial Framing and the 2008 Presidential Campaign (2009) with Joe Feagin, "offers one of the first sociological analyses of Barack Obama's historic 2008 campaign for the presidency of the United States." Wingfield and Feagin discuss white racial framing and the myth that Obama's election occurred in so-called post-racial America.
- Doing Business with Beauty: Black Women, Hair Salons, and the Racial Enclave Economy (2008) examines how working-class black women use entrepreneurship as a route to upward mobility, in particular establishing business models that center explicitly on black women's unique needs.

== Featured work ==
Wingfield is a contributing writer for Harvard Business Review, Slate, The Atlantic, Fortune, and Inside Higher Ed, and she has been quoted on NPR and in newspapers such as The New York Times, The Guardian, the Chicago Sun Times, Pacific Standard, and the Christian Science Monitor.

Wingfield analyzed the racial components of the popular sociological term "glass escalator" in her 2009 article, "Racializing the Glass Escalator: Reconsidering Men's Experiences with Women's Work" which she published in the journal, Gender & Society. Her article is widely cited and acclaimed.

== Awards ==
- 2019 "C. Wright Mills Award" from the Society for the Study of Social Problems for her book Flatlining: Race, Work, and Health Care in the New Economy
- 2018 "Public Understanding of Sociology Award" from the American Sociological Association
- 2014 "Distinguished Book Award in Race, Gender, and Class Section" from the American Sociological Association for her book No More Invisible Man: Race and Gender in Men's Work"
- 2013 "Richard A. Lester Award for Outstanding Book in Labor Economics and Industrial Relations" from Princeton University for her book No More Invisible Man: Race and Gender in Men's Work
- 2013 "Emerging Scholar, Diverse" from Issues in Higher Education
- 2012 "Distinguished Early Career Award in Section on Racial and Ethnic Minorities" from the American Sociological Association
- 2010 "Outstanding Author Contribution" from the Emerald Literati Awards for Excellence
- 2010 "Distinguished Article Award in Race, Gender, and Class Section" from the American Sociological Association for her 2009 article, "Racializing the Glass Escalator: Reconsidering Men's Experiences with Women's Work"
- 2010 Guest of Honor, "Celebrating Faculty Excellence" from Georgia State University
- 2010 "Outstanding Junior Faculty Award, College of Arts and Sciences" from Georgia State University

== Personal life ==
Wingfield's father, William B. Harvey, Doctor of Education, was also an academic, and her mother was a K-12 educator.
