= Edward B. Reuter =

American sociologist

Edward Byron Reuter (July 19, 1881 – May 28, 1946) was an American sociologist and the 23rd President of the American Sociological Association (for the year 1933). His research focused on the field of sociology of race and ethnic relations.

== Biography ==
Reuter's father was a German immigrant who migrated to the St. Louis, Missouri from Cologne, Germany. His father briefly mined gold in California before establishing a farm in Holden, Missouri and marrying Reuter's mother.

Reuter studied social sciences at the University of Missouri. In 1910 he did his bachelor's degree there, and in 1911 his master's degree. For the next three years, he served as the principal of a high school in California. He then continued his sociology studies at the University of Chicago, where he was influenced by Albion Woodbury Small, William Isaac Thomas, Robert Ezra Park, and George Herbert Mead. In 1919 he received his Ph.D. with his dissertation The Mulatto in the United States.

As a professor, Reuter taught at the University of Illinois, Tulane University, the University of Iowa, and finally, from 1944 until his death, succeeding Robert E. Park at Fisk University in Nashville.

In his research, Reuter examined in particular the relationships between biological and sociological phenomena and the relationships between ethnic groups. He served as the President of the American Sociological Association in 1933.

He died in Nashville, Tennessee in 1946.

== Works ==
Reuter published a number of books and articles, including:

- Population Problems, 1923 (revised edition in 1937)
- The American Race Problem, 1927 (revised edition in1938)
- Race Mixture, 1931
- Race and Culture Contacts, 1934.
