= John M. Gillette =

American sociologist (1866–1949)

John Morris Gillette (1866–1949) was an American sociologist, specializing in rural sociology, and the 18th president of the American Sociological Association (in 1928).

== Biography ==
Before pursuing an academic career, in 1895 Gillette briefly served as a Presbyterian minister in Dodge City, Kansas. He received his MA from Princeton University in 1895 and his Ph.D. from the Chicago Theological Seminary in 1899 and then in sociology from the University of Chicago in 1901.

From 1903 to 1907 he taught, as a professor of sociology and anthropology, at the Valley State Teachers College in North Dakota. From 1907 until his retirement in 1948 he taught at the University of North Dakota. In 1908 he established the department of sociology and anthropology there, which he chaired until his retirement.

In 1928 he was elected to be the President of the American Sociological Society.

== Influence ==
Gillette is considered one of the founders and important representatives of the field of rural sociology studies in the United States, a field he contributed through with his publications such as Constructive Rural Sociology (1913) and Rural Sociology (1922).

Another area of research he contributed to was the study of relationship between variable weather conditions and people's economic status.

== Works ==
- Constructive Rural Sociology (1913).
- Rural Sociology (1922).
