= Shelley Correll =

American sociologist

- Born: Houston, Texas, USA
- Known for: Motherhood penalty

Academic background
- Education: BS, 1989, Texas A&M University; MA, 1996, PhD, 2001, Stanford University
- Thesis: The gendered selection of activities and the reproduction of gender segregation in the labor force (2001)

Academic work
- Institutions: Stanford University

Shelley Joyce Correll is an American sociologist. She is the Michelle Mercer and Bruce Golden Family Professor of Women's Leadership Director at Stanford University. In 2026, Correll became the 117th president of the American Sociological Association.

== Early life and education ==
Correll was born and raised in Houston, Texas, to a police officer father and stay-at-home mother. Upon earning her Bachelor of Arts degree from Texas A&M University, Correll became a high school chemistry teacher while also interning at Dow Chemical Company and taking master's levels classes in sociology at the University of Houston. She noticed that the boys in her chemistry class were undeterred by setbacks while the girls lacked confidence to believe they were good at chemistry in spite of good grades. Correll was encouraged by one of her professors to apply for a PhD in sociology and received a full scholarship to Stanford University. Her thesis was focused on "the way that stereotypes about fields affect the extent to which men and women come to see themselves as being skilled in that area." While working towards her thesis, she earned funding from Stanford's Institute for Research on Women and Gender to study why women and men end up in sex-segregated fields or specialties.

== Career ==
From 2003 to 2009, Corell taught at Cornell, following a two-year stint at the University of Wisconsin-Madison. Upon accepting the position, she co-led a gender-equity directive called CU-ADVANCE, with funding from the National Science Foundation. The aim of the initiative was to recruit more women for engineering and science faculty positions. One of the results of this directive found that women were underrepresented at Cornell's sciences, engineering, social science, behavioral science, and math programs and felt less satisfied in their positions.

As co-director of the Advancing Cornell's Commitment to Excellence and Leadership, Correll also began developing the Motherhood penalty theory, which argued that women with children were considered less competent and dedicated than their childless or male coworkers. Working alongside graduate student Stephen Benard, they authored Getting a Job: Is There a Motherhood Penalty? and Cognitive Bias and the Motherhood Penalty. They surveyed paid undergraduate student-volunteers to evaluate fake resumes and determine which person would be the best to head a new marketing department. All students were given equally qualified, same-gender profiles with different parental status. The conclusion of the survey determined that participants viewed mothers as significantly less competent and committed than women without children. As a result of her research, Corell was the recipient of a 2008 Alice H. Cook and Constance E. Cook Award and 2009 Rosabeth Moss Kanter Award for Excellence in Work Family Research.

Correll was promoted to Full professor of Sociology in 2012 and later named the inaugural Director of the Clayman Institute for Gender Research, a center aimed at promoting women's leadership in business, government and education. In this role, Correll authored a new method for reducing gender biases and inequalities within the workforce which focuses on re-education. She led a research team over three years using this method of re-education with several technology companies, resulting in positive outcomes. When speaking of her method, Correll said it focused on "educating managers and workers about bias, diagnosing where gender bias could enter their company’s hiring, promotion or other evaluation practices and working with the company’s leaders to develop tools that help measurably reduce bias and inequality." In recognition of her efforts, Correll received the 2017 Feminist Mentor Award by Sociologists for Women in Society.

Correll stepped down as director of the Clayman Institute for Gender Research after nine years and was replaced by Adrian Daub. She was introduced to Michelle Mercer during her tenure as director and was specifically appointed the Michelle Mercer and Bruce Golden Family Professor of Women's Leadership Director in 2019 as a "tribute of her important work."

== Awards ==
Correll's research has received many awards. In 2008 she received the Distinguished Article Award in the Sex and Gender section. In 2009 she received the Rosabeth Moss Kanter Award for Excellence in Work Family Research from the American Sociological Association. In 2016, she was awarded the SWS Feminist Lecturer Award and in 2017 the SWS Feminist Mentor Award from the Sociologists for Women Society. She received the Alice H. Cook and Constance E. Cook Award in 2008 at Cornell University. With Correll as the director, the Clayman Institute received the 2019 Presidents Awards for Excellence Through Diversity.
