= Joe Feagin =

American sociologist

Joe R. Feagin
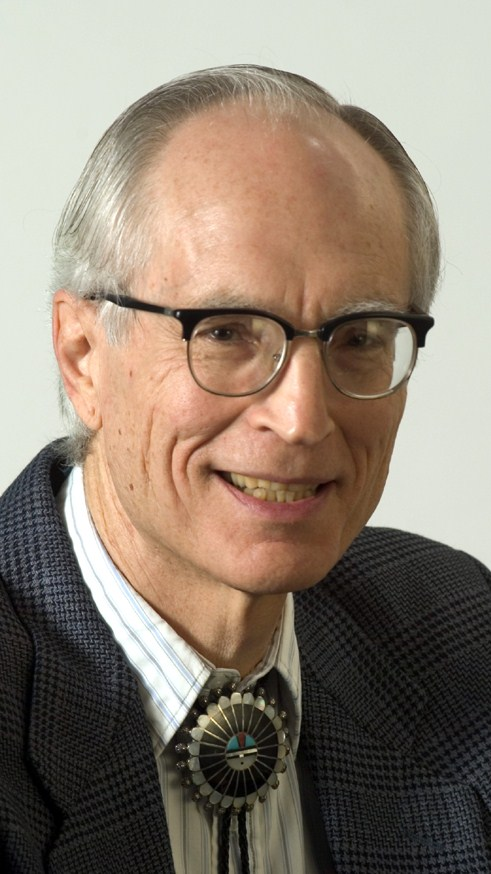
- Born: May 6, 1938 (age 88); San Angelo, Texas, United States
- Education: Harvard University; Baylor University
- Awards: Nomination for Pulitzer Prize; W.E.B Du Bois Career of Distinguished Scholarship Award; Arthur Fletcher Lifetime Achievement Award; Founder's Award for Scholarship and Service; Cox-Johnson-Frazier Scholarship Award; 2018 Excellence in Research Award for Elite White Men Ruling
- Scientific career
- Fields: Sociology
- Workplaces: Texas A&M University; University of Florida; University of Texas, Austin

Joe Richard Feagin (/feɪɡɪn/; born May 6, 1938) is an American sociologist and social theorist who has conducted extensive research on racial and gender issues in the United States. He is currently the Ella C. McFadden Distinguished Professor at Texas A&M University.

== History ==
Feagin has previously taught at the University of Massachusetts, Boston, University of California, Riverside, University of Texas at Austin, and the University of Florida. He focused most of his research work on race and ethnic relations, and served as the scholar in residence at the U.S. Commission on Civil Rights. He has written over 60 books. He is the 2006 recipient of a Harvard Alumni Association achievement award and was the 1999–2000 president of the American Sociological Association.

== Early life ==
Feagin was born in San Angelo, Texas, in May 1938. He spent most of his childhood and adolescence in Houston, in the area now known as West University Place. He attended Mirabeau B. Lamar High School.

== Education ==
He completed his undergraduate education at Baylor University in 1960 and moved to Boston, where he earned a Ph.D. in sociology (social relations) from Harvard University in 1966. He was scholar-in-residence at the US Civil Rights Commission (1974–1975). He is the Ella C. McFadden and Distinguished Professor of Liberal Arts at Texas A&M University. His research and teaching interests concern mainly the development and structure of racial and gender prejudice and discrimination, especially institutional and systemic discrimination and racism.

== Works ==
Feagin has published books which have won national and professional association awards. Ghetto Revolts (Macmillan 1973) was nominated for a Pulitzer Prize. He is the 2006 recipient of a Harvard Alumni (HDS) Association lifetime achievement award and was the 1999–2000 president of the American Sociological Association

=== Research (books) ===
He is author of over 200 research articles and 70 plus books on racial, gender, and urban issues. Amongst his books are:

- Asian American Women with S. Chang (in preparation)
- A Systemic Racism Critique of Racial Theories with S. Elias (Boulder: Paradigm Publishers, in preparation)
- Microaggressions and the Language of Racial Analysis with E. Chun (New York: Routledge, in preparation)
- Rethinking Diversity Issues in Higher Education with E. Chun (New York: Routledge, in press 2019)
- Latino Peoples in the New America: Racialization and Resistance with J. Cobas, D. Delgado, and M. Chávez (New York: Routledge-Paradigm, 2019)
- The Global Color Line: Racial and Ethnic Inequality and Struggle from a Global Perspective 2nd ed. edited with P. Batur-Vanderlippe (Greenwich, CN: JAI Press, 2019)
- Racist America 4th ed. with K. Ducey (New York: Routledge, 2018)
- Elite White Men Ruling: Who, What, Where, and How with K. Ducey (New York: Routledge, 2017)
- Systemic Racism: Making Liberty, Justice, and Democracy Real edited by R. Thompson-Miller and K. Ducey; contributors present research on systemic racism in honor of mentor and friend, Dr. Joe Feagin (Palgrave Macmillan, 2017)
- How Blacks Built America (New York: Routledge, 2016)
- Racial Theories in Social Science with S. Elias (New York: Routledge, 2016)
- How Blacks Built America (New York: Routledge, 2015)
- Jim Crow’s Legacy: The Lasting Impact of Segregation with R. Thompson-Miller and L. H. Picca (Lanham, MD: Rowman and Littlefield, 2015)
- "Pulling Back the ‘Post-Racial’ Curtain: Critical Pedagogical Lessons from Both Sides of the Desk," in K. Haltinner, ed., Teaching Race and Anti-Racism in Contemporary America: Adding Context to Colorblindness (New York: Springer, 2014). (with J. C. Mueller).
- "Systemic Racism Theory: Critically Examining College Sport Leadership," in L. L. Martin (Ed.), Out of Bounds: Racism and the Black Athlete (Westport, CT: Praeger Publishers, 2014). (with M. R. Regan and A. R. Carter-Francique).
- Liberation Sociology with Hernan Vera and K. Ducey (3rd ed., Paradigm Books, 2014)
- Latinos Facing Racism: Discrimination, Resistance, and Endurance with José A. Cobas (Paradigm Publishers, 2014)
- Racist America (3rd ed., Routledge, 2014)
- The White Racial Frame: Centuries of Racial Framing and Counter-Framing (2nd ed., Routledge, 2013)
- Yes We Can: White Racial Framing and the Obama Presidency with A. Harvey-Wingfield (2nd ed., Routledge, 2013)
- White Party, White Government: Race, Class, and U.S. Politics (Routledge, 2012)
- Racial and Ethnic Relations with Clairece Booher Feagin (9th ed.; Prentice-Hall, 2011)
- How the United States Racializes Latinos: White Hegemony and its Consequences edited, with José A. Cobas and Jorge Duany (Paradigm Books, 2009)
- Systemic Racism: A Theory of Oppression (Routledge, 2006)
- Social Problems: A Power-Conflict Perspective (6th ed., Prentice-Hall, 2005)
- Black in Blue: African-American Police Officers and Racism Kenneth Bolton with Joe R. Feagin (Routledge, 2004)
- White Men on Race with Eileen O'Brien (Beacon, 2003)
- The Many Costs of Racism with Karyn McKinney (Rowman & Littlefield, 2003)
- The First R: How Children Learn Race and Racism with Debra Van Ausdale (Rowman & Littlefield, 2001)
- White Racism: The Basics with Hernan Vera and Pinar Batur (2nd ed., Routledge, 2001)

Other notable books:

- In 2014 he published a book about Asian Americans with Rosalind S. Chou titled Myth of the Model Minority: Asian Americans Facing Racism (2nd ed., Paradigm Publishers, 2014). The second edition added new research on how racial stereotyping is gendered and sexualized. New interviews showed that Asian American men felt emasculated in America's male hierarchy. Women recounted their experiences of being treated as sexual objects. The new data reveal how race, gender, and sexuality intersected in the lives of Asian Americans. The text offered the first in-depth exploration of how Asian Americans experiencedand coped with everyday racism. The book depicted the “double consciousness” of many Asian Americans, who experienced racism but felt pressure to conform to images of their group as America's highly achieving “model minority.”
- In 2007, Feagin published Two-Faced Racism: Whites in the Backstage and Frontstage, written with Leslie Houts Picca (Routledge, 2007). Two-Faced Racism examines and explains racial attitudes and behaviours exhibited by whites in private settings. The core of the book drew upon journals of racial events kept by white college students at twenty-eight colleges in the United States. The book tried to understand how whites thought in racial terms.
- In 1996, Feagin published The Agony of Education: Black Students at a White University with Hernan Vera and Nikitah Imani (Routledge, 1996). The Agony of Education is about the life experience of African American students attending a historically white university, based on interviews conducted with black students and parents concerning their experiences with one state university, and studies of the black experience at state universities.

=== Research (peer-reviewed articles) ===
He is author of over 200 research articles on racial, gender, and urban issues. Amongst his articles are:

- "#BlackLivesMatter: Innovative Black Resistance," Sociological Forum forthcoming 2019 (with J. Nummi and C. Jennings)
- "Free Space is Valuable Space: Lessons from Chocolate Cities," Ethnic and Racial Studies 42 (2019): 431–438. (with C. Jennings)
- "Systemic Racism and 'Race' Categorization in U.S. Medical Research and Practice," American Journal of Bioethics 17 (2017):54–56.
- "The Persistence of White Nationalism in America," Contexts (2017) online journal pages
- "The Costs of Policing Violence: Foregrounding Cognitive and Emotional Labor," Critical Sociology 41 (2015):887–895. (with L. Evans)
- "Systemic Racism and U.S. Health Care," Social Science & Medicine 103 (2014):7–14. (with Z. Bennefield).
- "Rethinking Racial Formation Theory: A Systemic Racism Critique," Ethnic and Racial Studies 36 (2012):1–30. (with S. Elias).
- "The Racial Dialectic: President Barack Obama and the White Racial Frame," Qualitative Sociology 31 (2012) (with A.H. Wingfield)
- "Language Oppression and Resistance: Latinos in the United States," Ethnic and Racial Studies 31 (2008): 390–410 (with J. Cobas)
- "Latinos/as and the White Racial Frame," Sociological Inquiry 78 (2008): 39–53 (with J. Cobas)
- "Continuing Injuries of Racism: Counseling in a Racist Context," The Counseling Psychologist 35 (2007): 106–115 (with R. Thompson-Miller)
- "Success and Failure: How Systemic Racism Trumped the Brown v. Board of Education Decision," University of Illinois Law Review (2004): 1099–1130 (with B.M. Barnett)
- "Heeding Black Voices: The Court, Brown, and Challenges in Building a Multiracial Democracy," University of Pittsburgh Law Review 66 (2004): 57–81
- "Documenting The Costs of Slavery, Segregation, and Contemporary Discrimination: Are Reparations in Order for African Americans?" Harvard Black Letter Law Journal 20 (2004): 49–80
- "White Supremacy and Mexican Americans: Rethinking the Black-White Paradigm", Rutgers Law Review 54 (2002): 959–987.
- "The Continuing Significance of Racism: U.S. Colleges and Universities", American Council on Education, Occasional Papers 1 (2002): 1–54.
- "The Many Costs of Discrimination: The Case of Middle-Class African Americans," Indiana Law Review 34 (2001): 1313–1360 (with K. Early and k.D. McKinney)
- "Social Justice and Sociology: Agendas for the Twenty-First Century," American Sociological Review 66 (February 2001):1–20.
- "Doing Antiracism and Making a Nonracist Society," Contemporary Sociology, 29 (2000): 95–110 (with J. Johnson and S. Rush)
- "Excluding Blacks and Others from Housing: The Foundation of White Racism," Cityscape: A Journal of Policy Development and Research 4 (1999): 79–91
- "The Family Costs of White Racism: The Case of African American Families," Journal of Comparative Family Studies 29 (1998) (with Y. St. Jean)
- "Using Racial and Ethnic Concepts: The Critical Case of Very Young Children," American Sociological Review 61 (October 1996):779–793. (with D. Van Ausdale).
- "Violent Police-Citizen Encounters: An Analysis of Major Newspaper Accounts," Critical Sociology 22 (1996): 29–49 (with K. Lersch)
- "Racism in the Post-Colonial World," International Policy Review 6 (1996): 30–40 (with P. Batur)
- "White Racism: Bibliographic Essay," Choice 33 (1996): 903–914 (with A. Porter)
- "Affirmative Action and African Americans: Rhetoric and Practice," Humboldt Journal of Social Relations 21 (1995): 81–104 (with A. Porter)
- "Superior Intellect?: Sincere Fictions of the White Self," Journal of Negro Education 64 (1995): 296–306 (with H. Vera and A. Gordon)
- "Rethinking White-Black Relations in the United States: Toward a Theory of Racism as Sacrificial Waste," Journal of Contemporary Sociology 31 (1994): 162–182 (with H. Vera)
- "Reparations for Catastrophic Waste," Poverty and Race 3 (1994): 4 (with H. Vera)
- "The Continuing Significance of Race: Antiblack Discrimination in Public Places," American Sociological Review 56 (February 1991):101–116.

== Recent public contributions ==
In 2007, Feagin along with Jessie Daniels at Hunter College in NYC launched Racism Review a website designed to provide a credible and reliable source of information for journalists, students and members of the general public who are seeking solid evidence-based research and analysis of “race,” racism, ethnicity, and immigration issues, especially as they undergird and shape U.S. society within a global setting.

== Professional experience ==
=== Previous positions ===
- Graduate research professor, University of Florida, 1990–2004
- Professor of sociology, University of Texas (Austin), 1975–1990
- Scholar-in-residence, U.S. Commission on Civil Rights, 1974–1975
- Associate professor of sociology, University of Texas (Austin), 1970–1974
- Assistant professor, University of California (Riverside), 1966–1970

=== Affiliations ===
- American Sociological Association
- Sociologists for Women in Society
- Association of Black Sociologists
- Sociologists without Borders

=== Awards and honors ===
- Nomination for Pulitzer Prize (Ghetto Revolts)
- Scholar-in-Residence, U.S. Commission on Civil Rights, 1974–1975.
- Sociological Research Association, 1986–present.
- Phi Beta Kappa Alumni Scholar (Baylor University)
- Gustavus Myers Center Outstanding Human Rights Book Award, 1995 (Living with Racism)
- Gustavus Myers Center Outstanding Human Rights Book Award, 1996 (White Racism: The Basics)
- American Sociological Association, Oliver C. Cox Book Award, 1996 (White Racism: The Basics)
- University of Florida Research Foundation Professor, 1997–1999
- Honorary Life Member, Phi Kappa Phi honor society, 1999
- Robert and Helen Lynd Award for Lifetime Contribution to Community and Urban Sociology, 2000
- Special Award, Section on Racial and Ethnic Minorities, for Racist America and lifetime of work in racial and ethnic relations, 2002
- Choice award for Liberation Sociology as one of the best books of 2002
- ASA Section's Distinguished Undergraduate Student Paper Award named for Joe Feagin (2003)
- University of Illinois Center on Democracy in a Multiracial Society, Symposium on the Research and Contributions of Joe Feagin (April 2004).
- Choice award for White Men on Race as one of the best books of 2003.
- Sociologists without Borders (SSF) Distinguished Professor (2005)
- Harvard Alumni Association (HDS) Rabbi Martin Katzenstein Award (2006)
- Sociologists without Borders (SSF), the Richard Wright Award (2006)
- Center for Healing of Racism Ally Award (2006)
- Fellow, Center for the Study of Poverty and Inequality, Stanford University, 2006-
- Butler A. Jones lecture, Cleveland State University (2007)
- Soka Gakkai International-USA Social Justice Award (2012)
- Arthur Fletcher Lifetime Achievement Award, American Association for Affirmative Action (2013)
- ASA Section on Racial & Ethnic Minorities' Founder's Award for Scholarship & Service (2013)
- “Top Professor” (Lifetime Achievement) Award, Affordable-Colleges-Online.Org (2013)
- W.E.B. Du Bois Career of Distinguished Scholarship Award, American Sociological Association (2013)
- Distinguished professor, Texas A&M University (Spring 2014)
- Texas NAACP Civil Rights Hero Award
- 16th Charles R. Lawrence II Lecturer, Brooklyn College, CUNY (New York), September 2016
- Festchrift in my honor: Ruth Thompson-Miller and Kimberley Ducey, eds., Systemic Racism: Making Liberty, Justice, and Democracy Real. (London, UK: Palgrave Macmillan, 2017)
- Cox-Johnson-Frazier Scholarship Award (American Sociological Association 2018)
- Excellence in Research Award for Elite White Men Ruling (University of Winnipeg 2018)
- Public Understanding of Sociology Award (American Sociological Association 2019)
- Texas A&M University College of Education Legacy of Excellence and Equity Research Award (2019)

=== Administrative and editorial positions ===
- Vice-president, Society for Study of Social Problems, 1986–87
- Chair, ASA Section on Racial and Ethnic Minorities, 1994–1995
- Member of Council, American Sociological Association, 1995–2000
- Editorial Board, Comparative Urban and Community Research
- Editorial Board, Sage Racial and Ethnic Relations Series
- Editorial Board, Race and Society
- Governing Board, Southern Regional Council, 1997–1998
- President, American Sociological Association, 1999–2000
- Editor, Perspectives on a Multiracial America, Rowman & Littlefield, 2003–present
- Editor, New Critical Viewpoints Series, Paradigm Books, 2010–Present
