= Society and Mental Health =

Academic journal

- Discipline: Sociology
- Language: English
- Edited by: Fred E. Markowitz (Northern Illinois University)

Publication details
- History: 2011-present
- Publisher: Sage Publishing on behalf of the American Sociological Association (United States)
- Frequency: Triannual
- Impact factor: 3.0 (2024)

Standard abbreviations
- ISO 4: Soc. Ment. Health

Indexing
- ISSN: 2156-8693

Links
- Journal homepage; Online access; Online archive

Society and Mental Health is a triannual peer-reviewed academic journal published by Sage Publishing on behalf of the American Sociological Association Section on the Sociology of Mental Health. It publishes "original articles that apply sociological concepts and methods to the understanding of the social origins of mental health and illness, the social consequences for persons with mental illness, and the organization and financing of mental health services and care. Society and Mental Health publishes articles that advance the sociology of mental health and illness, stimulate further research, inform treatments and policy and reflect the diversity of interests of its readership." The current editor-in-chief is Fred E. Markowitz (Northern Illinois University). The previous editors were Scott Schieman (University of Toronto) and Alex Bierman (University of Calgary).
