= Jill Quadagno =

American sociologist

Jill S. Quadagno (born November 4, 1942) is Professor of Sociology at Florida State University where she holds the Mildred and Claude Pepper Eminent Scholar Chair in Social Gerontology. She has been a recipient of a Postdoctoral Fellowship from the National Science Foundation, a National Science Foundation Visiting Professorship for Women, the Distinguished Scholar Award of the ASA Section on Aging, a John Simon Guggenheim Fellowship, and an American Council of Learned Societies Fellowship. In 1994 she served as Senior Policy Advisor on the President's Bipartisan Commission on Entitlement and Tax Reform, and in 1998 she served as president of the American Sociological Association. She was elected to the Institute of Medicine in 2010.

== Publications ==
- Aging in Early Industrial Society: Work, Family, and Social Policy in Nineteenth-century England, Academic Press (1982) ISBN 978-0-12-569450-6
- The Transformation of Old Age Security: Class and Politics in the American Welfare State, University of Chicago Press (1988) ISBN 978-0-226-69923-3
- The Color of Welfare: How Racism Undermined the War on Poverty, Oxford University Press (1994) ISBN 978-0-19-507919-7
- One Nation, Uninsured: Why the U.S. Has No National Health Insurance, Oxford University Press (2006) ISBN 978-0-19-531203-4
- Aging and the Life Course: An Introduction to Social Gerontology (Textbook, 5th ed.), McGraw-Hill (2011) ISBN 978-0-07-352822-9
