= City & Community =

Quarterly academic journal

- Discipline: Sociology
- Language: English
- Edited by: Richard E. Ocejo

Publication details
- History: 2002-present
- Publisher: SAGE Publishing on behalf of the American Sociological Association
- Frequency: Quarterly
- Impact factor: 1.133 (2019)

Standard abbreviations
- ISO 4: City Community

Indexing
- ISSN: 1535-6841 (print); 1540-6040 (web)
- LCCN: 2001215098
- OCLC no.: 1017788469

Links
- Journal homepage; Online access; Online archive

City & Community is a quarterly peer-reviewed academic journal published by SAGE Publishing on behalf of the Community and Urban Sociology Section of the American Sociological Association. It was established in 2002 with Anthony Orum as the founding editor. The journal covers the interface of global and local issues, locally embedded social interaction and community life, urban culture and the meaning of place, and sociological approaches to urban political economy, as well as urban spatial arrangements, social impacts of local natural and built environments, urban and rural inequalities, virtual communities, and other topics germane to urban life and communities that will advance general sociological theory. The co-editor-in-chiefs are Brian J. McCabe (Georgetown University) and Ann Owens (University of California, Los Angeles).

According to the Journal Citation Reports, the journal has a 2019 impact factor of 1.133.

== Past editors ==
The following persons have been editors-in-chief:

- Brian J. McCabe (Georgetown University) and Ann Owens (University of California, Los Angeles) (2026–Present)
- Richard Ocejo (Graduate Center, CUNY and John Jay College of Criminal Justice) (2020–2025)
- Deirdre Oakley (Georgia State University) (2018–2020)
- Lance Freeman (Columbia University) (2015–2018)
- Sudhir Venkatesh (Columbia University) (2015–2017)
- Hilary Silver (Brown University) (2009–2015)
- Anthony Orum (University of Illinois at Chicago) (2002–2009)
