= New York State Sociological Association =

The New York State Sociological Association (NYSSA) is a professional organization of sociologists and those interested in sociology. Founded in 1952, NYSSA holds annual academic conferences (meetings) and publishes an online journal. The first NYSSA conference was hosted by Cornell University.

Papers selected by peer review for presentation at NYSSA conferences are eligible for submission to The New York Sociologist. Submissions are then peer reviewed for possible inclusion. NYSSA also provides a platform for student participation and awards an undergraduate and a graduate paper at each Annual Meeting.

According to NYSSA, membership is “made up of people teaching in the fields of Sociology, Social Work, Criminal Justice, Anthropology, and Women's studies, as well as graduate and undergraduate scholars in these fields.” The organization also claims a significant number of social workers among their members.

== See also ==
- American Sociological Association
