= Teaching Sociology =

- Discipline: Sociology, Education
- Language: English
- Edited by: Michele Lee Kozimor

Publication details
- History: 1973-present
- Publisher: SAGE Publications for the American Sociological Association (United States)
- Frequency: Quarterly
- Impact factor: 1.302 (2017)

Standard abbreviations
- ISO 4: Teach. Sociol.

Indexing
- ISSN: 0092-055X (print); 1939-862X (web)
- LCCN: 73646931
- JSTOR: teacsoci
- OCLC no.: 1789172

Links
- Journal homepage; Journal page at ASA; Journal page at Sage

Teaching Sociology is a quarterly academic journal in the field of sociology. It has been published since 1973 by American Sociological Association. The journal's goal is to publicize both theoretical and practical information useful for professionals teaching sociology courses.

== History ==
Teaching Sociology incorporates Teaching Newsletter (1979–1985), which was formerly named On Teaching Undergraduate Sociology Newsletter (197?-1979).
