= Frank W. Blackmar =

American sociologist and historian

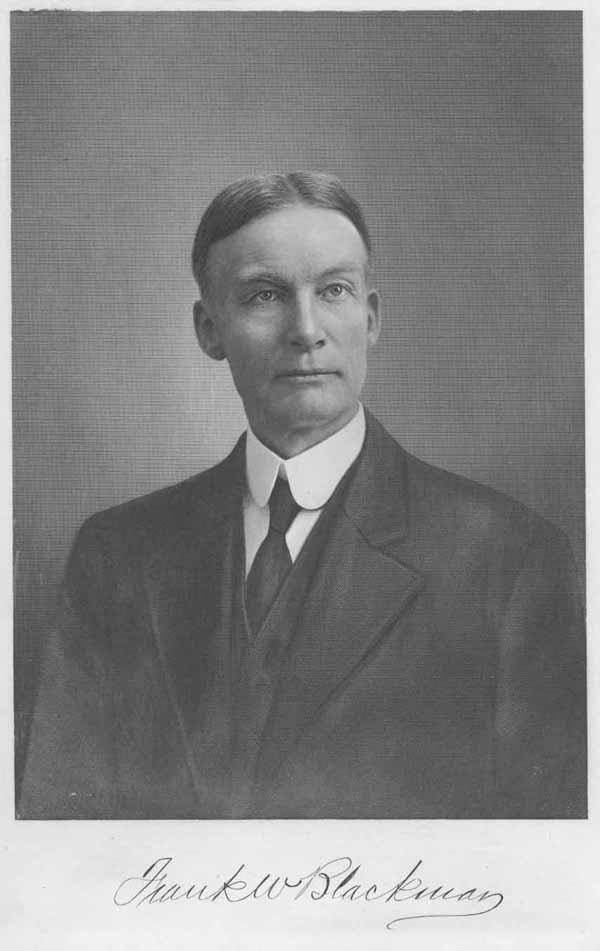
Portrait of F.W. Blackmar

Frank Wilson Blackmar (November 3, 1854 – March 30, 1931) was an American sociologist, historian and educator. He served as the 9th President of the American Sociological Society (now known as the American Sociological Association).

== Biography ==
He was born on November 3, 1854, in Springfield Township, Erie County, Pennsylvania.

Before earning a Ph.D. in 1889 at the Johns Hopkins University in Baltimore, he was a professor of mathematics in the University of the Pacific (1881–1886). After he became a professor of history and sociology at the University of Kansas. Ten years later he was made professor of sociology and economics at the same university. He became active in the university extension movement throughout the western United States, writing and lecturing on history, sociology and economics. He was elected dean when the graduate school of the University of Kansas was organized in 1896.

He wrote several books of local history, handbooks of economy and some political pamphlets.

In 1915 he co-authored, with John L. Gillin, Outlines of sociology, described as "the first widely used introductory text" on sociology.

He died on March 30, 1931, in Lawrence, Kansas.

== Main works ==
- Spanish Colonization of the Southwest, 1890; 1891.
- The Story of Human Progress, 1896.
- History of Higher Education in Kansas, 1900 .
- Life of Charles Robinson, 1900.
- Elements of Sociology, 1907.
- Economics for Colleges, 1907.
- Economics for High Schools, 1907.
- Frank W. Blackmar, ed. (1912), Kansas, a cyclopedia of state history, embracing events, institutions, industries, counties, cities, towns, prominent persons, etc. ... with a supplementary volume devoted to selected personal history and reminiscence., Chicago: Standard Publishing Company, OL 13489994M
- Outlines of sociology, 1915 (with John L. Gillin)
- Justifiable Individualism, 1922.

== Sources ==
- Frank W. Blackmar, ed. (1912). "Blackmar, Frank Wilson". Kansas: A Cyclopedia of State History. Chicago: Standard Pub. Co. p. 191.
