= Melvin L. Kohn =

American sociologist (1928–2021)

Melvin Lester Kohn (October 19, 1928 – March 19, 2021) was an American sociologist and past president of the American Sociological Association. He was a professor at Johns Hopkins University and conducted research on social structure and personality.
