= Visual Studies (journal) =

- Discipline: visual studies
- Language: English

Publication details
- Former name: Visual Sociology
- History: 1986 to present
- Publisher: Taylor & Francis on behalf of the International Visual Sociology Association
- Frequency: quarterly

Standard abbreviations
- ISO 4: Vis. Stud.

Indexing
- ISSN: 1472-586X (print); 1472-5878 (web)

Links
- Journal homepage; Visual Studies at IVSA

Visual Studies is a triannual peer-reviewed academic journal of visual studies published by Taylor & Francis on behalf of the International Visual Sociology Association. The journal was established in 1986 as Visual Sociology, obtaining its current name in 2002. The editor-in-chief is Darren Newbury (University of Brighton). The journal is abstracted and indexed in the International Bibliography of the Social Sciences, Scopus, and the Arts & Humanities Citation Index.
