= Sociological Association of Ireland =

Professional academic society for sociologists in Ireland

The Sociological Association of Ireland (SAI) is the professional academic society for sociologists in Ireland, and was founded in 1973. The academic journal of the SAI is the Irish Journal of Sociology, which is published by SAGE. SAI members come from a variety of different backgrounds, ranging through postgraduate students, lecturers, civil servants and social researchers. The SAI is notable as a sociological association as it draws members from the Republic of Ireland, Northern Ireland and Great Britain, in addition to many international members.

== International networks ==
The Sociological Association of Ireland is a member of the European Sociological Association (ESA), and the International Sociological Association (ISA).

== SAI Annual Conference ==
The SAI hosts an annual conference for members and international delegates to promote the discussion of sociological topics.

== Organisational structure of the SAI ==
The SAI is governed by the SAI Executive Committee, consisting of a President, Vice President, Treasurer and Membership Secretary. Decisions are monitored and ratified by the SAI Executive Committee. The executive committee meets twice a semester, in addition to organising the SAI's Annual Conference.

== Past and current SAI Presidents ==
- Dr. Treasa Galvin (TCD)
- Dr. Iarfhlaith Watson (UCD)
- Dr. Amanda Haynes (UL)
- Prof. Tom Inglis (UCD)
- Dr. Ciaran McCullagh (UCC)
- Dr. Liam Leonard (IT Sligo)
- Dr. Paul Ryan (NUIM) 2014-17
- Dr. Lucy Michael (Ulster) 2017-2019
- Dr. John O'Brien (WIT) 2019–Present

== Past and current Irish Journal of Sociology editors ==
- Dr. Anne Byrne (NUIG)
- Dr. Ricca Edmonson (NUIG)
- Dr. Tony Varley (NUIG)
- Dr. Donal Igoe (NUIG)
- Dr. Alice Feldman (UCD)
- Prof. Tom Inglis (UCD)
- Prof. Stephen Mennell, (UCD)
- Dr. Iarflaith Watson (UCD)
- Dr. Anne Cleary (UCD)
- Dr. Colin Coulter (NUIM)
- Dr. Linda Connolly (UCC)
- Dr. Niamh Hourigan (UCC)
- Dr. Linda Grey (NUIM)
- Dr. Brian Conway (NUIM)
- Dr. Mat Creighton (UCD)
