= Joya Misra =

American sociologist

- Occupation: Sociologist

Academic background
- Education: Centenary College of Louisiana (BA); Emory University (PhD)

Academic work
- Institutions: University of Georgia; University of Massachusetts, Amherst
- Doctoral students: Dwanna L. McKay

Joya Misra is Professor of Sociology and Public Policy, University of Massachusetts, Amherst.

== Early life and education ==
Misra earned her bachelor's degree in Religion from Centenary College of Louisiana in 1988, and her Ph.D. in Sociology from Emory University in 1994. She is a second-generation immigrant who grew up in the South.

== Academic career ==
Professor Misra joined the Department of Sociology at the University of Georgia in 1994, where she was affiliated with Women’s Studies. In 1999, she joined the Department of Sociology and Center for Public Policy & Administration at the University of Massachusetts, with affiliations with the Women, Gender, and Sexuality Studies Department and Labor Studies program. In 2009, she was promoted to Professor of Sociology and Public Policy at the university. She has served as interim Sociology Department Chair and the Graduate Program Director, as well as Director of the Institute for Social Science Research and Director of ADVANCE Programming.

== Organizations ==
Misra is the Past President of the American Sociological Association. Prior to her election in 2022, she served several leadership roles for the ASA, including Vice President, Council Member, Chair of the ASA Distinguished Book Committee, Chair of the Sex and Gender Section, and Chair of the Race, Gender, and Class Section. From 2011 to 2015, Misra was the editor of Gender & Society.

== Major works ==
The intersection of gender and race in the labor market

In her 2003 article co-authored with Irene Browne, Misra identifies how the intersection of race and gender shape the US labor market, including wage inequality; discrimination and stereotyping; and immigration and domestic labor, establishing intersectionality as a foundational perspective to understand labor market inequalities.

Misra’s scholarship focuses on inequalities by gender and gender identity, race, class, ethnicity, sexuality, nationality, citizenship, parenthood status and educational level. Much of her work considers how policies may both reinforce and lessen inequalities. Her research on work-family policies uses a cross-national perspective, with a focus on ways that social policies can entrench or remediate existing inequalities. Her collaborative work further considers how culture intersects with structure, to explain where and when policies are most effective.

With Kyla Walters, she published a book that focuses on how retail work is organized in the 21st century. This work explores how race, gender, and class condition workers' experiences with managers, co-workers, and customers. It also considers more deeply how race and gender shape the aesthetic labor that retail clothing workers must do.

== Awards and honors ==
Joya Misra’s numerous awards include the Eastern Sociological Society Public Sociology Award (2022), the Roy J. Zuckerberg Endowed Leadership Chair (2022-2024), the University of Massachusetts Samuel F. Conti Faculty Fellowship (2020–21), and the University of Massachusetts Chancellor’s Leadership Fellow (2016–17). Misra's research has been supported by grants from the National Science Foundation. In 2009 she won the inaugural World Bank/Luxembourg Income Study Gender Research Award.

Misra is a celebrated teacher and mentor, receiving the Sociologists for Women in Society Mentoring Award in 2010. At the University of Massachusetts, she was awarded the College of Social and Behavioral Sciences Outstanding Teaching Award (2004–05) and the Sociology Mentoring Award (2009–10, 2014–15).
