= Eric Margolis (sociologist) =

American visual sociologist

Eric Margolis (born 1947) is an American sociologist and associate professor at Arizona State University in the Hugh Downs School of Human Communication, known for his work on higher education and in the field of visual sociology.

== Biography ==
Margolis obtained his BA in sociology in 1969 at the State University of New York at New Paltz, and his PhD in sociology in 1978 at the University of Colorado Boulder, with the thesis entitled "The Politics of Understanding." In his thesis he analyzed "the structures and functions of paradigms in the sociology of education, and designs a model for the use of non-print media in interactive research."

Margolis started his academic career as sociology instructor at the University of Colorado Boulder from 1970 to 1975, followed by a year at the Regis University in 1976–77. Back at the University of Colorado he was visiting lecturer in 1979, assistant professor in 1981, and visiting lecturer from 1982 to 1985. In 1986 he was lecturer at the Department of American Studies in Yale University, and then got appointed at the University of Oregon, visiting assistant professor from 1990 to 1992 and assistant professor from 1992 to 1995. In 1995 he moved to the Arizona State University as assistant professor at the Division of Educational Leadership and Policy Studies, and since 2001 associate professor, and in 2010 shifted to the Hugh Downs School of Human Communication.

Margolis has been president of the International Visual Sociology Association in 2013–14.

== Selected publications ==
- Margolis, Eric ed., The Hidden Curriculum in Higher Education, [edited volume] New York and London: Routledge, 2001.
- Margolis, Eric, and Luc Pauwels, eds. The Sage handbook of visual research methods. Sage Publications, London, 2011.

Articles, a selection:

- Margolis, Eric, and Mary Romero. "The department is very male, very white, very old, and very conservative": The functioning of the hidden curriculum in graduate sociology departments." Harvard Educational Review 68.1 (1998): pages 1-33.
- Margolis, Eric. "Class pictures: Representations of race, gender and ability in a century of school photography." Visual Studies 14.1 (1999): pages 7-38.
- Margolis, E., Soldatenko, M., Acker, S., & Gair, M. (2001). "Peekaboo." The hidden curriculum in higher education, pages 1-20.
