= James P. Lichtenberger =

American sociologist

James Pendleton Lichtenberger (10 June 1870 – 17 March 1953) was an American sociologist and academic. Lichtenberger served as the twelfth president of the American Sociological Association.

== Early life and education ==
Lichtenberger was born on 10 June 1870 in Decatur, Illinois to Conrad H. and Anna Elizabeth Lichtenberger, née Nesbitt. Lichtenberger attended Eureka College and received a bachelor's degree in 1893. He soon after enrolled in the ministry of the Church of the Disciples of Christ and was a pastor in the church in Canton, Illinois from 1896 to 1899, after which we transferred to a congregation in Buffalo, New York. He remained in Buffalo until 1902, the year in which he left for Ohio to attend Hiram College and earn a Master of Arts degree.

Following his graduation from Hiram College, Lichtenberger moved to New York City to maintain a congregation. Lichtenberger left his congregation in 1908 to take up a fellowship at the New York School of Philanthropy connected with Columbia University, which later became the Columbia University School of Social Work. While at the School of Philanthropy, Lichtenberger completed a dissertation in political science entitled Divorce: A Study in Social Causation in 1909, under the supervision of Franklin H. Giddings

== Career ==
At the School of Philanthropy, Lichtenberger met sociologist Carl Kelsey. Kelsey, a professor at the University of Pennsylvania, arranged for an invitation to Lichtenberger to take up an assistant professorship at Penn. Lichtenberger accepted the invitation, and subsequently remained at the University of Pennsylvania his entire professional career.

In 1922, Lichtenberger served as president of the American Sociological Association (then, Society), and addressed the 1923 annual meeting in Chicago with his presidential address entitled "The Moral Dualism of Machiavelli." Lichtenberger also served as secretary of the American Academy of Political and Social Science from 1912 until his death in 1953, as well as an occasional editor of the academy's Annals between 1912 and 1918.

== Bibliography ==
- Lichtenberger, James P. (1923). Development of Social Theory. New York and London: The Century Company. ISBN 978-1135552220.
- Lichtenberger, James P. (1931). Divorce: A Social Interpretation. New York and London: McGraw-Hill. ISBN 978-1258664220.
