= Leonard M. Henny =

Leonard (Melchior) Henny (The Hague, 4 August 1935 – Amsterdam, 17 September 2011) was a Dutch filmmaker, teacher, and writer, known for his socially engaged documentaries, and his pioneering work in the field of visual sociology.

== Work ==
=== Visual sociology ===
In 1978 Henny had started writing on the functions of images in society in a short work, entitled "Film and video in sociology." In 1985 he published a more general seminal paper on visual sociology, entitled "A short history of visual sociology." He started this paper by stipulating the apparent absurdity of the term "visual sociology," arguing:

It somehow implies that there is ‘verbal’ sociology and ‘visual’ sociology. Obviously, however, we never speak of ‘verbal sociologists’ because we all know that a sociologist is, by definition, virtually caught in a Gutenberg Syndrome. Sociologists usually argue with words and figures. Yet this has not always been the case..."

And furthermore about the origin of visualisation in the emerging field of sociology in the late 19th century:

...the first issues of the American Journal of Sociology [established in 1895] published many photographs taken by sociologists and social photographers... In many of the issues of the AJS in the first fifteen years of its existence photos were published mainly to support the articles on social reform. Today we tend to look with some nostalgia and with some scepticism at the use of photographs in the early days of sociology...

Early social photographers of those days were Lewis Hine and Jacob Riis. And there were succeeded in the 1920s by a new generation of sociologists and photographers such as Walker Evans and Dorothea Lange. Henry (1985) described, that images kept being used in sociological research until in the 1970s a "revival of interest in the function of images in society among sociologists" led to the emerge of visual sociology.

== Movies / documentaries (incomplete) ==
Henny made the following the movies / documentaries:

- In search of Don Quichotte (Spanje, La Mancha, 1959)
- But What Do We Do? (1966)
- Peace Pickets Arrested for Disturbing the Peace (1968)
- Huey! (samen met Sally Pugh, 1968)
- The Resistance (1968)
- Black Power, We're Goin' Survive America (1968)
- Dead Earth (VS, 1970)
- Schitzophrenia of Working for War (VS, 1970)
- Dead End Street? (VS, 1970)
- Why Worry (1972)
- Vietnam Veteran (samen met Kees Hin 1970–1973)
- Getting It Together (samen met Jan Boon, 1973)
- The Maori land struggle (New Zealand, 1980)
- How nations Televise Each Other (Nederland en VS, 1984)
- Video Eyes - Video Ears, Dead Earth en Giftaal (1988)
- Desenkadena (samen met Gloria Lowe, 2000)

== Selected publications ==
- Henny, Leonard M. Film and video in sociology. Utrecht, University of Utrecht
- Henny, Leonard M. Raising Consciousness through Film: Audio-visual Media and International Development Education, Utrecht 1980.

Articles, a selection:

- Henny, Leonard M. "A short history of visual sociology." Current Sociology 34.3 (1986): 1–4; Reprinted in Jason Hughes ed. SAGE Visual Methods, (2012), p. 1-4
- Henny, Leonard M. "Use the Media to Reach the People: Social Sculpture," Critical Sociology 1(2) p. 4-4, 1970.
- Henny, Leonard M. "Films as a Weapons in the Struggle to Liberate the American Mind," Critical Sociology 1(2), p. 5-5, 1970.
