= Sociology of Education (journal) =

- Discipline: Sociology, Education
- Language: English
- Edited by: Linda Renzulli

Publication details
- History: 1963-present
- Publisher: SAGE Publications in association with the American Sociological Association
- Frequency: Quarterly
- Impact factor: 3.617 (2019)

Standard abbreviations
- ISO 4: Sociol. Educ.

Indexing
- ISSN: 0038-0407 (print); 1939-8573 (web)
- LCCN: 30008323
- OCLC no.: 40777440

Links
- Journal homepage; Online access; SOE at the ASA

Sociology of Education is a peer-reviewed academic journal that publishes papers in the fields of Sociology and Education. The journal's editor is Linda Renzulli (Purdue University). It has been in publication since 1963 and is currently published by SAGE Publications in association with American Sociological Association.

== Publication history ==
The journal was originally named The Journal of Educational Sociology, which began publication in 1927, sponsored by the Payne Educational Sociology Foundation of Phi Delta Kappa. The title was changed to Sociology of Education in 1963, and became sponsored by the American Sociological Association. The publication changed to a quarterly distribution schedule and continued the volume numbering of its predecessor.

== Scope ==
Sociology of Education publishes research that aims to examine how social institutions and individuals' experiences within these institutions affect educational processes and social development. The journal provides a forum for studies in the sociology of education and human social development.

== Abstracting and indexing ==
Sociology of Education is abstracted and indexed in, among other databases: SCOPUS, and the Social Sciences Citation Index. According to the Journal Citation Reports, its 2019 impact factor is 3.617. In 2017, it ranked 17 out of 238 journals in the category 'Education & Educational Research'. and 10 out of 146 journals in the category 'Sociology'.
