= Iranian Sociological Association =

Non-profit professional organization

- Formation: 1991; 35 years ago
- Headquarters: Tehran, Jalal Al-Ahmad Highway, Faculty of Social Sciences, University of Tehran, Office of the Iranian Sociological Association / Postal Code: 1411713118 / PO Box: 14395/864
- Leader: Seyed Hossein Sirajzadeh
- Website: www.isa.org.ir

The Iranian Sociological Association Persian: انجمن جامعه‌شناسی ایران is a non-profit and a professional organization of social scientists in Iran. Established in Tehran on 1991. The first president of the association would be Gholam-Abbas Tavassoli.

In 2024 Tehran judicial system closed down the organization.

== Presidents ==
The following people have been presidents of the Iranian Sociological Association:

1. Gholam-Abbas Tavassoli: - -2000
2. Muhammad Abdollahi: 2000–2002
3. Muhammad Abdollahi: 2002–2004
4. Saeed Moeidfar: 2004–2006
5. Saeed Moeidfar: 2006–2008
6. Seyed Hossein Sirajzadeh: 2008–2010
7. Mohammad Amin Ghani Rad: 2010–2013
8. Mohammad Amin Ghani Rad: 2013–2016
9. Seyed Hossein Sirajzadeh: 2016–2019
10. Seyed Hossein Sirajzadeh: 2019–2022
11. Saeed Moeidfar: 2022-2025
12. Shirin Ahmadnia: 2025-2028

== Specialized Magazines ==
The association has several specialized journals in the field of sociological issues:

- Iranian Journal of Sociology
- Journal of Iranian Social Studies
- Iranian Political Sociology Quarterly
