= Photo elicitation =

Method of interview used in research

Photo elicitation is a method of interview used in research which incorporates photographs in the interviews. The method is participatory-oriented and is used in different research areas such as visual sociology, marketing research, and public health. In the method, images are used to prompt and guide in-depth interviews and to evoke reactions from the interview participant. The types of images used include photographs, video, paintings, cartoons, graffiti, and advertising, among others. Either the interviewer or the subject may provide the images.

== Objective ==
The purpose of photo-elicitation interviewing is to record how subjects respond to images, attributing their social and personal meanings and values, and to allow the interview to be more driven by the participant. The meanings and emotions elicited may differ from or supplement those obtained through strict verbal inquiry. Regions of the brain that process visual information are evolutionarily and developmentally older than the parts that process verbal information.

== Description ==
Visual images can evoke emphatic understanding of how other people experience their world. Photo elicitation has been used successfully in a range of studies and is common in participatory research with young children and marginalised communities.

Photo elicitation is unique to the interviewer as well as to the subject. When a photograph is taken, it has meaning to the interviewer, formed in part by the context of the image. To another interviewer, the same photograph may illustrate a similar concept, but two interviewers will never have exactly the same initial reaction to any image.

This is an ideal method of qualitative research for those who are naturally visual learners. Also, our brain processes visuals differently from verbal communication. Therefore, photographs may also help to alleviate certain social anxieties that arise when discussing "difficult emotional subjects," such as illness, death, poverty, etc.

Many still question photo elicitation as a research method, claiming the photographs taken during social experiments to be better known as art, than as research. But there are certain sub-sets of data that can be produced when the interviewer and subject collaborate to create an image that are hard to capture by other traditional means of data gathering. Without these sub-sets, sometimes even the most important conclusions of research are empty when it comes to human emotion and expression.

== See also ==
- Advertising research
- Consumer behaviour
- Market research
- Visual sociology
- Visual anthropology
- Visual communication
- Visual culture
