= Sociological Methodology =

- Discipline: Sociology
- Language: English
- Edited by: David Melamed and Mike Vuolo

Publication details
- History: 1969–present
- Publisher: SAGE Publications on behalf of the American Sociological Association
- Frequency: Annual
- Impact factor: 6.118 (2021)

Standard abbreviations
- ISO 4: Sociol. Methodol.

Indexing
- ISSN: 0081-1750 (print); 1467-9531 (web)
- LCCN: 68054940
- OCLC no.: 224478492

Links
- Journal homepage; Journal page at publisher's website; Online access; Online archive (issues since 1997); Online archive (all issues)

Sociological Methodology is a biannual peer-reviewed academic journal that covers research methods in the field of sociology. The editors-in-chief are David Melamed and Mike Vuolo (The Ohio State University). It was established in 1969 and is currently published by SAGE Publications on behalf of the American Sociological Association.

== Abstracting and indexing ==
Sociological Methodology is abstracted and indexed in:

- Academic Search Premier
- Applied Social Sciences Index & Abstracts
- Biological Sciences Database
- Environmental Sciences & Pollution Management Database
- Current Index to Statistics
- EBSCO databases
- Ecology Abstracts
- International Bibliography of the Social Sciences
- Social Sciences Citation Index
- Social Services Abstracts
- Sociological Abstracts
- Worldwide Political Sciences Abstracts

According to the Journal Citation Reports, its 2021 impact factor is 6.118, ranking it 7th out of 148 journals in the category "Sociology".
