= Sociological Association of Aotearoa (New Zealand) =

Sociological organization

Sociological Association of Aotearoa (New Zealand) (SAANZ, or SAA(NZ)) was established in February 1988 from the transformation of the New Zealand Sociological Association, a branch of the Sociological Association of Australia and New Zealand (SAANZ).

SAANZ holds an annual conference and publishes an academic journal, the Journal of the Sociological Association of Aotearoa New Zealand.

Membership of SAA(NZ) stood at about 170 in the early 1990s.
