= American Sociological Association =

Non-profit organization

- Formation: December 1905; 120 years ago
- Headquarters: 1717 K Street NW, Suite 900, Washington, D.C., U.S.
- Members: 9,433 (2025)
- 2026 President: Shelley J. Correll
- Publication: Footnotes
- Website: www.asanet.org

The American Sociological Association (ASA) is a nonprofit organization dedicated to advancing the discipline and profession of sociology. Founded as the American Sociological Society by fifty people at Johns Hopkins University in December 1905, the first president was Lester Frank Ward. Today, most members work in academia, while about 20 percent work in government, business, or non-profit organizations. ASA publishes ten academic journals and magazines, including the American Sociological Review and Contexts, and four section journals. In 2025, the organization had 9,433 members, making it a larger association of sociologists than the International Sociological Association. The ASA is composed of researchers, students, college and university faculty, high school faculty, and practitioners.

== Founding and first century ==
In the United States, sociology was first taught as a college-level course at either Yale University in 1875 or at Indiana University in 1885. The country's first sociology department was established at the University of Kansas in 1889, with the first sociology graduate program established at the University of Chicago in 1892. The American Journal of Sociology became America's first explicitly sociological journal when it was founded at the University of Chicago in 1894.

At first, American sociology was strongly influenced by European thought. German social science was particularly influential at this time. Early figures in American sociology, such as Albion Small, Edward A. Ross, and Frank Wilson Blackmar became involved in an effort to distinguish American sociology from activities in Europe.

=== Founding ===
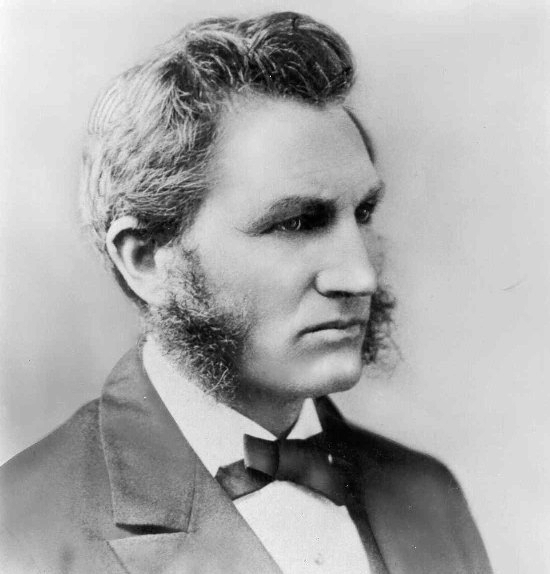
Lester Frank Ward, the first ASA president

In the summer of 1905, George Washington University professor C. W. A. Veditz began a discussion among sociologists throughout the United States, writing to several dozen people to gauge the need for or interest in forming a sociological organization. Sociologists debated whether there was a need for a separate organization from the American Economic Association, American Political Science Association and the American Historical Association, which most sociologists at the time were members of. Ultimately, a consensus was reached that the time had come for a society of sociologists in the U.S.

In early December, Veditz and eight others wrote to about 300 people inviting them to a special session during the American Economic Association (AEA) and American Political Science Association meetings later that month to discuss the potential formation of a sociological society. On December 27, approximately 50 people, including one woman, gathered in McCoy Hall at Johns Hopkins University, Baltimore, the group motioned to form a new society of sociologists. There was debate as to integrating this new society with an existing organization, such as the AEA. The group ultimately decided that the new society ought to be an independent entity.

At the end of the day of the initial meeting, those gathered at the meeting formed a five-person committee to develop a plan for the new society and how it should be governed. The committee members would re-convene the next afternoon to review the proposed structure of the society. Council members would include Edward A. Ross, W.F. Wilcox, Albion Small, Samuel Lindsay, D. C. Wells, and William Davenport. Lester Frank Ward was elected president, William Graham Sumner as first vice president, Franklin Giddings as second vice president, and C.W.A. Veditz as secretary and treasurer. Charlotte Perkins Gilman was also a charter member of the society. When the committee left Baltimore, the American Sociological Society was established. A constitution had been adopted, officers were elected, and plans were made for the second annual meeting of the new society.

=== First century ===
In 1917, George E. Vincent gave a presidential address titled "Countryside and Nation" which addressed economic and social conditions surrounding American agriculture. Vincent's address has since been highlighted as a foundational moment for rural sociology.

According to Don Martindale, the Midwest exerted a strong influence over early American sociology. By the middle of the 20th century, more than half of the presidents of the American Sociological Society were University of Chicago graduates. The perceived domination of Chicago sociologists in the society and at the American Journal of Sociology prompted some society members to believe that they held "an undue influence in the affairs of the Society". In 1935, this led to an annual meeting with "a distinctively anti-Chicago character". A coordinated effort among those resistant to the Chicago influence, involving what Faris called "behind-the-scenes politicking", led to the election of a non-Chicago secretary and the establishment of the American Sociological Review.

In 1953, during the annual meeting in Berkeley, California, each of the (living) past presidents of the society composed a voice recording to address the coming generation of sociologists.

In 1981, in celebration of the association's 75th anniversary, Lawrence J. Rhoades prepared a 90-page publication entitled A History of the American Sociological Association, 1905–1980, commonly referred to as the "1981 Rhoades History". The publication provides a brief overview of the founding and early years of the association, as well as highlights of key activities and events in the decades since.

In 2005, in celebration of the association's 100th anniversary, ASA published a 201-page book entitled A History of the American Sociological Association, 1981–2004. The publication picks up where the 1981 Rhoades history concludes, continuing the story and capturing the association's history from 1981 through 2004. It was the culmination of over two years of detailed research by Katherine J. Rosich.

== Recent events ==
ASA membership peaked at almost 15,000 in 2007 before declining to its current level below 10,000. The trend led to the formation of a Task Force on Membership in 2016, with recommendations released in 2019, addressing issues of community, cost, and value.

In early 2010, ASA publicly expressed outrage over a controversy involving Frances Fox Piven and Glenn Beck, asking Fox News to stop Beck's comments. An article written by Piven concerning mobilization of unemployed individuals had spurred the commentary by Beck. ASA suggests in their public statements that the line should be drawn at name calling and that political commentators should instead rely on gathering evidence related to the topics and then drawing the proper conclusions.

Within the environmental sociology section of the ASA, in 2016 an ad hoc Committee on Racial Equity investigated racial and ethnic diversity within the section in response to critique that the section was overwhelmingly white. Their assessment of the professional climate for scholars of colour concluded that the section was a 'white space' characterized by the overwhelming presence of whites and dominated by white leadership. They concluded that this situation acts as a barrier to inclusion of people of colour in the field, and that the field of environmental justice was likewise marginalised.

=== Position on Palestine and Israel ===
From 2023 to 2024, in response to the war in Gaza, sociologists organized to request that the American Sociological Association establish a stance calling for a ceasefire and pursuing divestment from arms. In December 2023, a letter signed by 125 sociologists including six former ASA presidents, asked for a statement in support of ceasefire. In February 2024, the association released a statement focusing on "deep concern and dismay regarding the loss of civilian lives in the context of continued violence in Gaza and Israel as well as other contexts of conflict and suffering unfolding across the globe." In March 2024, ASA rejected a resolution forwarded by a group known as Sociologists for Palestine which called for "an immediate and permanent ceasefire in Gaza". After this initial resolution was rejected, enough signatures were collected to support a ballot initiative calling for a ceasefire and divestment from military technologies, however the ASA council edited the request for divestment from the resolution claiming that investment represented an "operational issue" which members could not vote on. The Sociologists for Palestine group responded to this by declaring that the council's removal of the divestment request from the resolution was "fundamentally undemocratic". In May 2024, 59% of voting ASA members approved the Resolution for Justice in Palestine and it was adopted. Beyond calling for "an immediate and permanent ceasefire in Gaza", the adopted resolution specifies that the association "supports members' academic freedom, including but not limited to defending scholars' right to speak out against Zionist occupation."

In March 2026, Sociologists for Palestine submitted a petition for ASA members to vote on the boycott of Israeli academic institutions. This would involve preventing Israeli academic institutions from advertising jobs and announcements via the ASA and subscribing to its journals. They boycott would also involve the ASA not advertising study-abroad or research opportunities in collaboration with Israeli institutions. The petition was signed by more than 400 people. The proposed resolution said that Israeli academic institutions "play a central part in furthering Israeli occupation, apartheid, and genocide."

On March 12 2026, a letter from ASA president Shelley J. Correll and executive directory Heather M. Washington said that the proposal was ineligible for members to vote on it. The letter said that this was because the proposal would have an impact on ASA governance matters and business operations. In the letter, Correll and Washington said that following the 2024 Resolution for Justice in Palestine "many members" had left the organization. However, critics of this statement noted that ASA membership had been largely unchanged, going from 9,923 in 2023 to 9,319 in 2024, then 9,433 in 2025. A petition in support of the letter from Correll and Washington gathered just over 115 signatures.

From April 2026, Sociologists for Palestine organized a boycott of the ASA annual meeting. This involved ASA members not paying conference registration fees or booking accommodation with ASA hotels. In addition, supporters of the group arranged parallel activities to be run elsewhere in New York or via online meetings during the conference period. ASA moved the conference registration deadline from June 1 to June 15. The Jewish Voice for Peace academic council issued a statement endorsing the boycott, describing ASA leadership's actions as an "anti-democratic refusal to put a member-led resolution to a membership vote". By late June, Sociologists for Palestine said that over 800 people had signed up to this boycott.

== Publications, standards, and outreach ==
The association publishes the following academic journals and magazines:

- American Sociological Review
- The American Sociologist (1965—1982)
- City and Community
- Contemporary Sociology
- Contexts
- Journal of Health and Social Behavior
- Journal of World-Systems Research
- Social Psychology Quarterly
- Society and Mental Health
- Sociological Methodology
- Sociological Theory
- Sociology of Education
- Socius
- Teaching Sociology
- Sociology of Race and Ethnicity

The ASA also publishes Footnotes, a newsletter aimed at the association's members. Footnotes was established in 1979 and is published five times per year.

=== Code of ethics ===
The ASA is governed by a code of ethics, which has been revised since 1970, with the first ASA code of ethics being written in 1970. ASA members are bound by the code of ethics. The association also has codes for meeting behavior, disclosure, award revocation, and removal from leadership positions.

In 1993, then-doctoral student Rik Scarce was jailed for more than five months as a result of following the ASA's code of ethics. Scarce's Ph.D. research was on the radical environmental movement. Based on an FBI investigation of an Animal Liberation Front break-in, federal prosecutors argued in court that Scarce may have engaged in conversations with individuals believed to be involved with the incident. Prosecutors demanded that Scarce testify to a federal grand jury about those conversations, but Scarce refused to answer three dozen questions, citing the ASA Code of Ethics and the First Amendment as his reasoning for remaining unresponsive. Scarce's refusal to answer resulted in a contempt of court citation and 159 days spent in jail. He was never suspected of wrongdoing and—in keeping with contempt of court practice—he was never read his Miranda rights, arrested, or tried.

In January 2012, a United States district court ordered Boston College to turn over material from the "Belfast Project", an oral history project pertaining to the violence in Northern Ireland. Boston College filed an appeal in February 2012, challenging the district court's decision. ASA became involved in the case to help protect human participants from the subpoena of confidential project research data. The statement by the ASA council cited the potential damage this ruling would have on social science research by stifling the ability to study controversial topics. ASA is looking for an affirmation by the court for confidentiality in research.

=== ASA Style Guide ===
ASA style is a widely accepted format for writing university research papers that specifies the arrangement and punctuation of footnotes and bibliographies. Standards for ASA style are specified in the ASA Style Guide, which is designed to aid authors in preparing manuscripts for ASA journals and publications.

=== The "ASA Wikipedia" Initiative ===
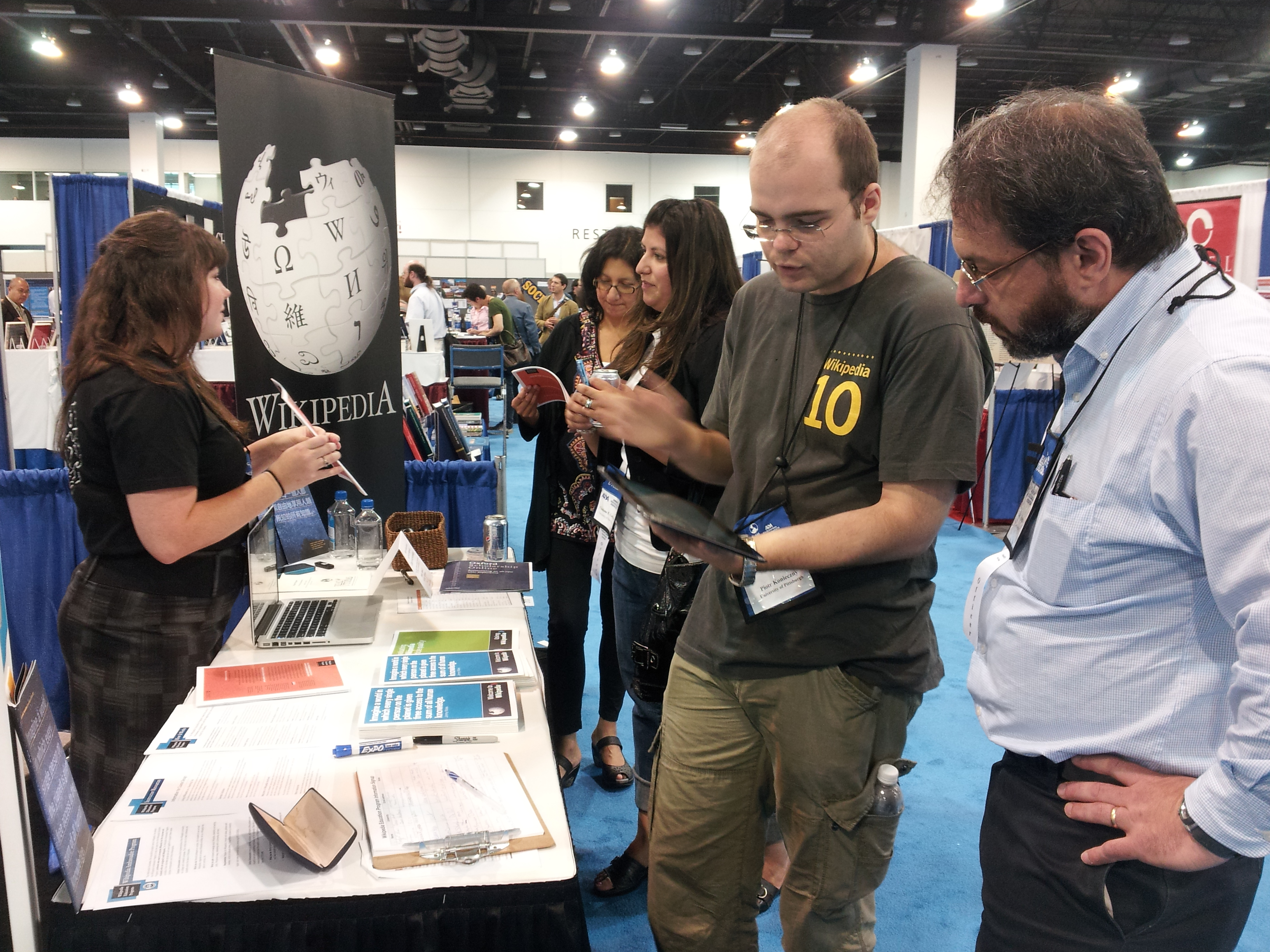
Wikipedia table at the 2012 annual meeting

In the fall of 2011, the ASA launched its "Sociology in Wikipedia" initiative. Erik Olin Wright, President of the ASA, called for improvement in sociological entries in Wikipedia. He asked that professors and students get more involved by having Wikipedia-writing assignments in class. The basic goal set forth by the initiative would be to make it easier for sociologists to contribute to Wikipedia, and for sociologists to become better involved in the writing and editing processes to ensure that social science articles are up-to-date, complete, accurate, and written appropriately.

In conjunction with the Wikimedia Foundation and a research group at Carnegie Mellon University, the ASA developed its Wikipedia Portal in an attempt to achieve the initiative's goal through providing tutorials on how to contribute; video discussions of norms and procedures; and lists of articles and subject areas that need improvement. The Portal would also provide instructions for professors on how to use Wikipedia writing assignments for academic courses.

=== Archive ===
The association's official archive was established in 1997 and is held at Pennsylvania State University's Paterno Library. The archive does not contain material produced prior to 1931. The material in the archive is split into eight series: Administrative File, Council, Committees and Sections, Funded Projects, Publications File, Organizations File, Miscellany, and Formerly Restricted Material. The archive includes verbatim minutes of ASA council meetings and correspondence between ASA leadership.

== Annual meeting ==
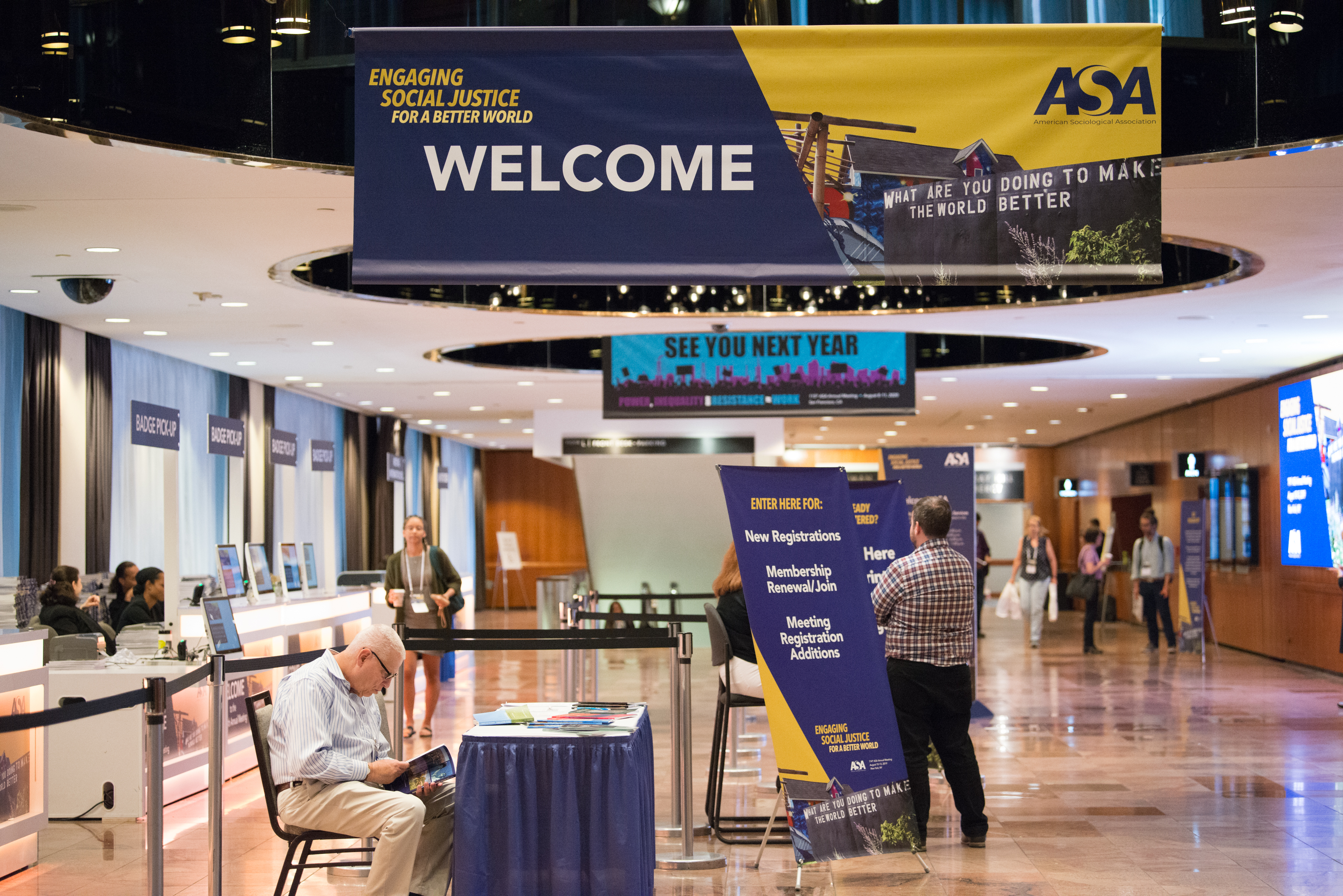
Registration desk at the 2019 annual meeting

The "American Sociological Association Annual Meeting" is an annual academic conference held by the association consisting of over 4,000 participants. The meeting is held each August to provide opportunity for sociologists to share research, develop professional networks, give awards, and hold committee meetings. The 2023 meeting had 4,802 attendees and featured 3,000 research papers.

The first ASA meeting was held in Providence, Rhode Island in December 1906. Meetings continued to be held at the end of December until the 1950 annual meeting in Denver, Colorado which was held in September. Since then, annual meetings have continued to be held in August or September. The 2020 and 2021 annual meetings were held online due to the disruption of the COVID-19 pandemic.

In recent years, the annual meeting has been held at the following locations:

- 2026: New York, NY
- 2025: Chicago, IL
- 2024: Montréal, Canada
- 2023: Philadelphia, PA
- 2022: Los Angeles, CA
- 2021: Virtual
- 2020: Virtual
- 2019: New York, NY
- 2018: Philadelphia, PA
- 2017: Montréal, Canada
- 2016: Seattle, WA
- 2015: Chicago, IL
- 2014: San Francisco, CA
- 2013: New York, NY
- 2012: Denver, CO
- 2011: Las Vegas, NV
- 2010: Atlanta, GA
- 2009: San Francisco, CA
- 2008: Boston, MA
- 2007: New York, NY
- 2006: Montréal, Canada
- 2005: Philadelphia, PA
- 2004: San Francisco, CA
- 2003: Atlanta, GA
- 2002: Chicago, IL
- 2001: Anaheim, CA
- 2000: Washington, DC
- 1999: Chicago, IL
- 1998: San Francisco, CA
- 1997: Toronto, Canada
- 1996: New York, NY
- 1995: Washington, DC
- 1994: Los Angeles, CA
- 1993: Miami Beach, FL
- 1992: Pittsburgh, PA
- 1991: Cincinnati, OH
- 1990: Washington, DC
- 1989: San Francisco, CA
- 1988: Atlanta, GA
- 1987: Chicago, IL
- 1986: New York, NY
- 1985: Washington, DC
- 1984: San Antonio, TX
- 1983: Detroit, MI
- 1982: San Francisco, CA
- 1981: Toronto, Canada
- 1980: New York, NY
- 1979: Boston, MA
- 1978: San Francisco, CA
- 1977: Chicago, IL
- 1976: New York, NY
- 1975: San Francisco, CA
- 1974: Montréal, Canada
- 1973: New York, NY
- 1972: New Orleans, LA
- 1971: Denver, CO
- 1970: Washington, DC
- 1969: San Francisco, CA
- 1968: Boston, MA
- 1967: San Francisco, CA
- 1966: Miami Beach, FL

== Awards ==
The ASA presents awards to individuals and groups. These awards are:

- Distinguished Scholarly Book Major ASA Award
- Dissertation Major ASA Award
- Excellence in the Reporting of Social Issues Major ASA Award
- Jessie Bernard Major ASA Award
- Cox-Johnson-Frazier Major ASA Award
- Award for the Public Understanding of Sociology Major ASA Award
- Distinguished Career Major ASA Award for the Practice of Sociology
- Distinguished Contributions to Teaching Major ASA Award
- W.E.B. Du Bois Career of Distinguished Scholarship Award

Additionally, the constituent sections of the ASA administer separate awards.

== Sections ==
ASA has sections or sub-groups where sociologists with shared interests can interact. Each section has its own leadership team as voted for by section members. ASA sections and sections-in-formation include:

- Aging and the Life Course
- Altruism, Morality, and Social Solidarity
- Animals and Society
- Asia and Asian America
- Biology and Society
- Children and Youth
- Collective Behavior and Social Movements
- Communication, Information Technologies, and Media Sociology
- Community and Urban Sociology
- Comparative-Historical Sociology
- Consumers and Consumption
- Creative Sociology (Section-in-Formation)
- Crime, Law, and Deviance
- Decision-Making, Social Networks, and Society
- Disability in Society
- Drugs and Society
- Economic Sociology
- Environmental Sociology
- Ethnomethodology and Conversation Analysis
- Family
- Global and Transnational Sociology
- Global Middle East and North Africa
- History of Sociology and Social Thought
- Inequality, Poverty, and Mobility
- International Migration
- Labor and Labor Movements
- Latina/o Sociology
- Marxist Sociology
- Mathematical Sociology
- Medical Sociology
- Methodology
- Organizations, Occupations, and Work
- Peace, War, and Social Conflict
- Political Economy of the World-System
- Political Sociology
- Race, Gender, and Class
- Racial and Ethnic Minorities
- Science, Knowledge, and Technology
- Social Psychology
- Sociological Practice and Public Sociology
- Sociology of Culture
- Sociology of Development
- Sociology of Education
- Sociology of Emotions
- Sociology of Human Rights
- Sociology of Indigenous Peoples and Native Nations
- Sociology of Law
- Sociology of Mental Health
- Sociology of Population
- Sociology of Religion
- Sociology of Sex and Gender
- Sociology of Sexualities
- Sociology of the Body and Embodiment
- Teaching and Learning in Sociology
- Theory

ASA has additional communities for students, community college faculty, contingent faculty, high school faculty, sociologists in practice settings, and retired sociologists.

== Presidents ==
The following persons have been presidents of the American Sociological Association:

1. Lester F. Ward 1906–1907
2. William G. Sumner 1908–1909
3. Franklin H. Giddings 1910–1911
4. Albion Woodbury Small 1912–1913
5. Edward A. Ross 1914–1915
6. George E. Vincent 1916
7. George E. Howard 1917
8. Charles Cooley 1918
9. Frank W. Blackmar 1919
10. James Q. Dealey 1920
11. Edward C. Hayes 1921
12. James P. Lichtenberger 1922
13. Ulysses G. Weatherly 1923
14. Charles A. Ellwood 1924
15. Robert E. Park 1925
16. John L. Gillin 1926
17. W. I. Thomas 1927
18. John M. Gillette 1928
19. William F. Ogburn 1929
20. Howard W. Odum 1930
21. Emory S. Bogardus 1931
22. Luther L. Bernard 1932
23. Edward B. Reuter 1933
24. Ernest W. Burgess 1934
25. F. Stuart Chapin 1935
26. Henry P. Fairchild 1936
27. Ellsworth Faris 1937
28. Frank H. Hankins 1938
29. Edwin Sutherland 1939
30. Robert M. MacIver 1940
31. Stuart A. Queen 1941
32. Dwight Sanderson 1942
33. George A. Lundberg 1943
34. Rupert B. Vance 1944
35. Kimball Young 1945
36. Carl C. Taylor 1946
37. Louis Wirth 1947
38. E. Franklin Frazier 1948
39. Talcott Parsons 1949
40. Leonard S. Cottrell Jr. 1950
41. Robert C. Angell 1951
42. Dorothy Swaine Thomas 1952
43. Samuel A. Stouffer 1953
44. Florian Znaniecki 1954
45. Donald Young 1955
46. Herbert Blumer 1956
47. Robert K. Merton 1957
48. Robin M. Williams Jr. 1958
49. Kingsley Davis 1959
50. Howard P. Becker 1960 (died in office)
51. Robert E. L. Faris 1961
52. Paul Lazarsfeld 1962
53. Everett C. Hughes 1963
54. George C. Homans 1964
55. Pitirim A. Sorokin 1965
56. Wilbert E. Moore 1966
57. Charles P. Loomis 1967
58. Philip M. Hauser 1968
59. Arnold Marshall Rose 1969 (died in office)
60. Ralph Turner 1969
61. Reinhard Bendix 1970
62. William H. Sewell 1971
63. William J. Goode 1972
64. Mirra Komarovsky 1973
65. Peter M. Blau 1974
66. Lewis A. Coser 1975
67. Alfred McClung Lee 1976
68. John Milton Yinger 1977
69. Amos H. Hawley 1978
70. Hubert M. Blalock Jr. 1979
71. Peter H. Rossi 1980
72. William Foote Whyte 1981
73. Erving Goffman 1982
74. Alice S. Rossi 1983
75. James F. Short Jr. 1984
76. Kai T. Erikson 1985
77. Matilda White Riley 1986
78. Melvin L. Kohn 1987
79. Herbert J. Gans 1988
80. Joan Huber 1989
81. William Julius Wilson 1990
82. Stanley Lieberson 1991
83. James S. Coleman 1992
84. Seymour Martin Lipset 1993
85. William A. Gamson 1994
86. Amitai Etzioni 1995
87. Maureen T. Hallinan 1996
88. Neil Smelser 1997
89. Jill Quadagno 1998
90. Alejandro Portes 1999
91. Joe R. Feagin 2000
92. Douglas S. Massey 2001
93. Barbara F. Reskin 2002
94. William T. Bielby 2003
95. Michael Burawoy 2004
96. Troy Duster 2005
97. Cynthia Fuchs Epstein 2006
98. Frances Fox Piven 2007
99. Arne L. Kalleberg 2008
100. Patricia Hill Collins 2009
101. Evelyn Nakano Glenn 2010
102. Randall Collins 2011
103. Erik Olin Wright 2012
104. Cecilia L. Ridgeway 2013
105. Annette Lareau 2014
106. Paula England 2015
107. Ruth Milkman 2016
108. Michèle Lamont 2017
109. Eduardo Bonilla-Silva 2018
110. Mary Romero 2019
111. Christine Williams 2020
112. Aldon Morris 2021
113. Cecilia Menjívar 2022
114. Prudence Carter 2023
115. Joya Misra 2024
116. Adia Harvey Wingfield 2025
117. Shelley J. Correll 2026

Elected

1. Alford A. Young, Jr 2027
2. Rory M. McVeigh 2028

== See also ==
- List of sociological associations
