= Visual sociology =

Area of sociology

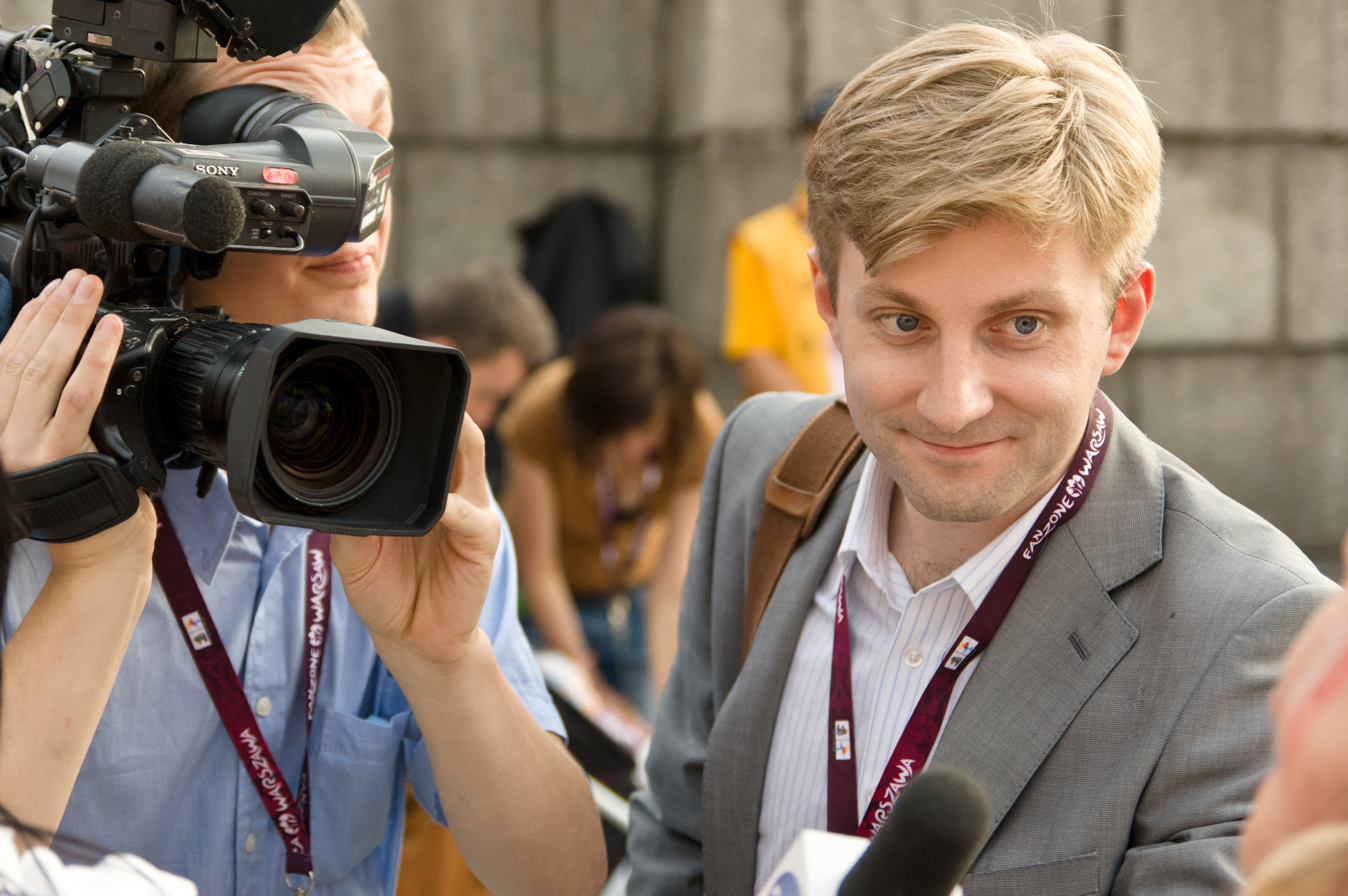
A camera person filming a fan with Krzysztof Bandych, Polish journalist (nSport channel) in Warsaw, just after the end of Poland-Greece match. UEFA Euro 2012, Poland.

Visual sociology is an area of sociology concerned with the visual dimensions of social life.

== Theory and method ==
Visual sociology can be theoretically framed around three themes. Luc Pauwels suggests that the framework is based on the origin and nature of visuals, research focus and design, and format and purpose.

There are at least three approaches to doing visual sociology:

=== Data collection using cameras and other recording technology ===
In this context, the camera is analogous to a tape recorder. Film and video cameras are particularly well suited as data gathering technologies for experiments and small group interactions, classroom studies, ethnography, participant observation, oral history, the use of urban space, etc. The tape recorder captures things that are not preserved in even the best researchers' field notes. Similarly, tape recordings preserve audible data not available in even the most carefully annotated transcripts: timbre, the music of a voice, inflection, intonation, grunts and groans, pace, and space convey meanings easily (mis)understood but not easily gleaned from written words alone. By opening another channel of information, visual recordings preserve still more information. For instance, the raised eyebrow, the wave of a hand, the blink of an eye might convert the apparent meaning of words into their opposite, convey irony, sarcasm, or contradiction. So, regardless of how one analyzes the data or what is done with the visual record, sociologists can use cameras to record and preserve data of interest so it can be studied in detail.

Visual recording technology also allows us to manipulate the data. Visual recording can be used to represent other forms of recording technology and non-digital multimedia. Visual recordings have long been employed by natural scientists because they make it possible to speed up, slow down, repeat, stop, and zoom in on things of interest. It is the same in the social sciences, recordings facilitate the study of phenomena that are too fast, or too slow, or too infrequent or too big or too small to study directly "in the life." Most importantly, through editing visual sociologists can juxtapose events to produce meanings. Sociologists may also be able to put cameras in places where one would not put a researcher: where it is dangerous, or where a person would be unwelcome, or simply to remove the observer effect from particular situations, e.g., studying social behavior among school children on a playground.

Photo elicitation is another technique of data gathering. This methodological tool is a combination of photography as the visual equivalent of a tape recorder, and ethnography or other qualitative methods. Photo elicitation techniques involve using photographs or film as part of the interview—in essence asking research subjects to discuss the meaning of photographs, films or videos. In this case the images can be taken specially by the researcher with the idea of using them to elicit information, they can belong to the subject, for example family photographs or movies, or they can be gathered from other sources including archives, newspaper and television morgues, or corporate collections. Typically the interviewee's comments or analysis of the visual material is itself recorded, either on audio tape or video, etc.

Photo voice is a related research method in which researchers give those being studied still or movie cameras. Research participants are taught to use the image making technology but are then responsible for making photos or movies which are subsequently analyzed either by the researchers or the participants, or both. The first use of photo voice was by Wang and Burris (published in 1994), where they defined it as "a method through which knowledge would be generated by people who were normally passive objects in the research process."

In any case, in this first sense visual sociology means including and incorporating visual methods of data gathering and analysis in the work of sociology. This method has recently been transferred to other academic disciplines, notably having been pioneered in contemporary religious research.

=== Studying visual data produced by cultures ===
Visual sociology attempts to study visual images produced as part of culture. Art, photographs, film, video, fonts, advertisements, computer icons, landscape, architecture, machines, fashion, makeup, hair style, facial expressions, tattoos, and so on are parts of the complex visual communication system produced by members of societies. The use and understanding of visual images is governed by socially established symbolic codes. Visual images are constructed and may be deconstructed. They may be read as texts in a variety of ways. They can be analyzed with techniques developed in diverse fields of literary criticism, art theory and criticism, content analysis, semiotics, deconstructionism, or the more mundane tools of ethnography. Visual sociologists can categorize and count them; ask people about them; or study their use and the social settings in which they are produced and consumed. So the second meaning of visual sociology is a discipline to study the visual products of society—their production, consumption and meaning.

=== Communication with images and media other than words ===
A third dimension of visual sociology is both the use of visual media to communicate sociological understandings to professional and public audiences, and also the use of visual media within sociological research itself.

In this context, visual sociology draws on the work of Edward Tufte, whose books Envisioning Information and The Visual Display of Quantitative Information address the communication of quantitative information. Qualitatively, visual sociology can be analyzed through content analysis, semiotics, and conversation analysis. Visual sociology considers the logics of presentation of sociological and anthropological documentarians and ethnographers like Robert Flaherty, Konrad Lorenz, Margaret Mead and Gregory Bateson, and Frederick Wiseman. Visual sociology also requires the development of new forms—for example, data driven computer graphics to represent complex relationships e.g., changing social networks over time, the primitive accumulation of capital, the flow of labor, relations between theory and practice. Visual methods have been popular in various disciplines and fields, such as tourism and event studies.

== See also ==
- Visual anthropology
- Visual communication
- Visual culture
