= Arne L. Kalleberg =

Norwegian social scientist and professor (born 1949)

- Born: February 9, 1949 (age 77); Larvik, Norway
- Education: Brooklyn College (BA); University of Wisconsin–Madison (MS/PhD in sociology)
- Scientific career
- Workplaces: Indiana University (1975–1985), University of North Carolina (1986–current)

Arne Lindeman Kalleberg (born February 9, 1949, in Larvik, Norway) is a Kenan Distinguished Professor of Sociology Emeritus at the University of North Carolina at Chapel Hill. He was a Faculty Fellow at the Carolina Population Center as well as an adjunct professor in the Kenan-Flagler Business School, the Department of Public Policy, and the Curriculum in Global Studies. Kalleberg served as the secretary of the American Sociological Association from 2001 to 2004 and as its president from 2007 to 2008. He was the editor-in-chief of Social Forces, An International Journal of Social Research from 2010 to 2026. He was elected to the National Academy of Sciences in 2024.

== Biography ==
Kalleberg received his B.A. from Brooklyn College and his M.S. and Ph.D. (in 1975) from the University of Wisconsin–Madison. He was a faculty member at Indiana University for 10 years, where he served as the director of the Institute of Social Research. He moved to the University of North Carolina at Chapel Hill in 1986. Previous administrative roles at the University of North Carolina at Chapel Hill include chair of the Department of Sociology (1990–2000), senior associate dean of The Graduate School (2001–2004), senior associate vice chancellor for graduate studies and research (interim) (2000–2001), senior associate dean for social sciences and international programs (2004–2007), director of international programs (2007–2008), and editor of Social Forces: An International Journal of Social Research (2010–2026). He has been a visiting professor at universities in Germany, Norway, South Korea, and Sweden.

== Research contributions ==
Kalleberg studies labor force issues at the interface of sociology, economics, and psychology. Much of his work is cross-national, comparative and multi-level, linking societal and organizational institutions and structures to individual outcomes. His contributions to sociology have focused on three main topics.

=== The Fit between Persons and Jobs ===
The degree to which peoples’ jobs “fit” or match their skills has important consequences for individuals, organizations, and societies. When peoples’ jobs match their needs, preferences, and abilities, then they are likely to be relatively happy and satisfied with their work and lives, and workplaces are apt to function fairly smoothly and effectively. On the other hand, when there is a “mismatch” or lack of fit between persons and their jobs, a variety of problems and difficulties are likely to result for the workers, their families, employers and the society more generally. The degree to which jobs “fit” persons depends on their degree of control people have over their employment situations, which in turn reflects their market power and the opportunities available in the labor market.

Kalleberg's research on this topic is represented by his early work on job satisfaction (Kalleberg, 1977), his comparative studies of organizational commitment and job satisfaction in Japan and the United States (e.g., Lincoln and Kalleberg, 1985) and his more recent book on The Mismatched Worker (Kalleberg, 2007).

=== Work Structures and Inequality ===
Institutions are central to sociological explanations of social and economic inequality. Kalleberg's research has sought to document how different kinds of work institutions, or work structures (occupations, industries, unions, classes) generate inequalities in economic as well as non-economic (such as autonomy and challenging work) rewards. He provided a conceptual framework of how multiple work structures and market combine to produce inequalities in his book with Ivar Berg, Work and Industry: Structures, Markets and Processes (1987).

Kalleberg's contributions to sociological explanations of labor markets show how institutional structures combine with characteristics of individuals (such as their gender, race, age, education, experience) to produce inequalities. This work is represented by Kalleberg and Sørensen (1979), Althauser and Kalleberg (1981); Sørensen and Kalleberg (1981); Kalleberg, Wallace and Althauser (1981); Kalleberg and Van Buren (1996). His research on occupations shows how they produce differences in wage inequality (e.g., Kalleberg and Griffin, 1980; Mouw and Kalleberg, 2010).

Kalleberg's research has also shown the potential of collecting information on nationally representative samples of organizations for addressing a wide range of outcomes related to inequality, both at the organizational level (e.g., Kalleberg, Knoke, Marsden and Spaeth, 1996; Kalleberg, Reynolds and Marsden, 2003) and for individuals (e.g., Kalleberg and Reskin, 1995).

=== Employment Relations ===
These two strands of Kalleberg's scholarship—on the fit between persons and jobs and on work and inequality—were joined in his ongoing research program on transformations in employment relations, which are implicit or explicit contractual arrangements that specify the reciprocal expectations and obligations linking employers and employees. Employment relations encompass a wide range of phenomena—including work organization, governance, evaluation and rewards—and so the study of employment relations is central to numerous subjects in the social sciences, including the origins and maintenance of economic inequality and social stratification; the operation of labor markets; mechanisms of skill acquisition and career mobility; recruitment, selection, hiring and promotion processes; and the governance and control of work activities within organizations. As the link between individuals and their employing organizations, employment relations provide a theoretical linchpin connecting multiple levels of analysis: macrostructures such as economic, political, legal and social institutions; mesoscopic (middle-range) aspects of work groups, firms and inter-firm networks; and micro-level features of employment including individual work experiences and rewards.

Kalleberg has written extensively on the causes and consequences of the emergence of nonstandard work arrangements such as temporary, contract, and part-time work in the US, Asia and Europe (e.g., Kalleberg, 2000, 2001, 2003, 2009, 2012; Kalleberg, Reskin and Hudson, 2000). His recent book, Good Jobs, Bad Jobs: The Rise of Polarized and Precarious Employment Systems in the United States, 1970s to 2000s (Russell Sage Foundation, 2011), discusses the rise of precarious employment in the United States as well as the growing polarization of jobs with regard to earnings as well as non-economic rewards such as the control people have over their work activities and schedules, especially in balancing work and family. He has also extended his studies of precarious work to various countries in Asia (e.g., Kalleberg and Hewison, 2013; Hewison and Kalleberg, 2013; Hsiao, Kalleberg and Hewison, 2015).

== Awards and recognition ==
- John Simon Guggenheim Memorial Foundation Fellowship (1984)
- Elected Fellow, American Association for the Advancement of Science (1997)
- Elected Inaugural Fellow, Labor and Employment Relations Association (2008)
- Distinguished Alumnus Award, Brooklyn College (2009)
- Elected Foreign Member, The Royal Norwegian Society of Sciences and Letters (2011)
- American Sociological Association Section on Inequality, Poverty and Mobility's Robert M. Hauser Distinguished Scholar Award (2015)
- Sage Publishing 10-Year Impact Award (2020)
- American Sociological Association Section on Organizations, Occupation, and Work's Rosabeth Moss Kanter Distinguished Career Award (2020)
- Induction to the National Academy of Sciences (2024)
- W.E.B. Du Bois Career of Distinguished Scholarship Award (2026)

== Books ==
- Kalleberg, Arne L. and Ivar Berg. 1987. Work and Industry: Structures, Markets and Processes. New York: Plenum. ISBN 978-0-306-42344-4
- Kalleberg, Arne L. (editor). 1988, 1989, 1990. Research in Social Stratification and Mobility, Volumes 7, 8, 9. Greenwich, Connecticut: JAI Press.
- Lincoln, James R. and Arne L. Kalleberg. 1990. Culture, Control, and Commitment: A Study of Work Organization and Work Attitudes in the United States and Japan. New York: Cambridge University Press. (New edition, with updated prologue, published by Percheron Press, Clinton Corners, New York, 2003.) ISBN 978-0-9719587-2-2
- Kalleberg, Arne L., David Knoke, Peter V. Marsden, and Joe L. Spaeth. 1996. Organizations in America: Analyzing Their Structures and Human Resource Practices. Thousand Oaks, CA: Sage. (Finalist for Academy of Management's 1997 George R. Terry Award for “Outstanding Contribution to the Advancement of Management Knowledge.”) ISBN 978-0-8039-5815-9
- Appelbaum, Eileen, Thomas Bailey, Peter Berg, and Arne L. Kalleberg. 2000. Manufacturing Advantage: Why High-Performance Work Systems Pay Off. Ithaca, New York: Cornell University Press. (Named one of the ten best books in the Princeton University list of Noteworthy Books in Industrial and Labor Economics in 2000.) ISBN 978-0-8014-3765-6
- Berg, Ivar and Arne L. Kalleberg (editors). 2001. Sourcebook of Labor Markets: Evolving Structures and Processes. New York: Kluwer/Plenum. ISBN 978-0-306-46453-9
- Epstein, Cynthia Fuchs and Arne L. Kalleberg (editors). 2004. Fighting for Time: Shifting Boundaries of Work and Social Life. New York: Russell Sage Foundation. ISBN 978-0-87154-286-1
- Kalleberg, Arne L., Steven L. Morgan, John Myles, and Rachel A. Rosenfeld (editors). 2004. Inequality: Structures, Dynamics and Mechanisms. Essays in Honor of Aage B. Sørensen. Oxford, UK: Elsevier Ltd. ISBN 978-0-7623-1140-8
- Kalleberg, Arne L. 2007. The Mismatched Worker. New York: W.W. Norton. ISBN 978-0-393-97643-4
- Edwards, John, Marion Crain, and Arne L. Kalleberg (editors). 2007. Ending Poverty in America: How to Restore the American Dream. New York: New Press. ISBN 978-1-59558-176-1
- Kalleberg, Arne L. 2011. Good Jobs, Bad Jobs: The Rise of Polarized and Precarious Employment Systems in the United States, 1970s-2000s. New York: Russell Sage Foundation, American Sociological Association Rose Series in Sociology. (Winner, Academy of Management's 2012 George R. Terry Award for “Outstanding Contribution to the Advancement of Management Knowledge;” Winner, American Sociological Association's Section on Inequality, Poverty and Mobility 2013 Best Book Award.) ISBN 978-0-87154-431-5
- Hsiao, Hsin-Huang Michael, Arne L. Kalleberg, and Kevin Hewison (editors). 2015. Policy Responses to Precarious Work in Asia. Taipei, Taiwan: Academia Sinica.
- Arne L. Kalleberg and Steven P. Vallas (editors). 2018. Precarious Work: Causes, Characteristics, and Consequences. (Research in the Sociology of Work Volume 31). Bingley UK: Emerald. ISBN 978-1-78743-288-8.
- Arne L. Kalleberg. 2018. Precarious Lives: Job Insecurity and Well-Being in Rich Democracies. Cambridge, UK: Polity Press. ISBN 978-15095-0649-1 (cloth); 978-15095-0650-7.
- Arne L. Kalleberg, Kevin Hewison and Kwang-Yeong Shin. 2021. Precarious Asia: Global Capitalism and Work in Japan, South Korea, and Indonesia. Stanford: Stanford University Press. ISBN 978-1-5036-1025-5.
- Kwang-Yeong Shin and Arne L. Kalleberg (editors). 2025. Middle Class Challenges and Contested Futures in the US and South Korea. London: Cambridge Scholars Publishing. ISBN 1-0364-4772-3.
- Peter A. Coclanis and Arne L. Kalleberg (editors). 2025. Challenging Capitalism: Paths Taken, Roads Ahead. London: Routledge. ISBN 978-1-0410-3038-6.

== Selected articles ==
- Althauser, Robert P. and Arne L. Kalleberg. 1981. "Firms, Occupations, and the Structure of Labor Markets: A Conceptual Analysis." Pp. 119 149 in Ivar Berg (editor), Sociological Perspectives on Labor Markets. New York: Academic Press.
- Hewison, Kevin and Arne L. Kalleberg (editors). 2013. Precarious Work in South and Southeast Asia. American Behavioral Scientist, Vol. 57, No. 4 (April), pp. 395–530. Introductory essay: “Precarious Work and Flexibilization in South and Southeast Asia,” pp. 395–402.
- Kalleberg, Arne L. 1977. "Work Values and Job Rewards: A Theory of Job Satisfaction." American Sociological Review 42(1):124 143.
- Kalleberg, Arne L. 2001. "Organizing Flexibility: The Flexible Firm in a New Century." British Journal of Industrial Relations 39: 479–504.
- Kalleberg, Arne L. 2000. "Nonstandard Employment Relations: Part-time, Temporary, and Contract Work." Annual Review of Sociology 26:341–365.
- Kalleberg, Arne L. 2003. “Flexible Firms and Labor Market Segmentation: Effects of Workplace Restructuring on Jobs and Workers.” Work and Occupations 30 (May): 154–175.
- Kalleberg, Arne L. 2009. “Precarious Work, Insecure Workers: Employment Relations in Transition.” American Sociological Review 74 (1): 1–22.
- Kalleberg Arne L. 2012. “Job Quality and Precarious Work: Controversies, Clarifications, and Challenges.” Work and Occupations 39(4): 427–448.
- Kalleberg, Arne L. and Larry J. Griffin. 1980. "Class, Occupation, and Inequality in Job Rewards." American Journal of Sociology 85: 731 768.
- Kalleberg, Arne L. and Kevin Hewison (editors). 2013. Precarious Work in East Asia. American Behavioral Scientist, Vol. 57, No. 3 (March), pp. 271–389. Introductory essay: “Precarious Work and the Challenge for Asia,” pp. 271–288.
- Kalleberg, Arne L. and Barbara F. Reskin. 1995. "Gender Differences in Promotion in the United States and Norway." Research in Social Stratification and Mobility 14: 237–264.
- Kalleberg, Arne L., Barbara F. Reskin, and Ken Hudson. 2000. "Bad Jobs in America: Standard and Nonstandard Employment Relations and Job Quality in the United States." American Sociological Review 65:256–278.
- Kalleberg, Arne L., Jeremy Reynolds, and Peter V. Marsden. 2003. "Externalizing Employment: Flexible Staffing Arrangements in U.S. Organizations." Social Science Research 32 (4): 525–552.
- Kalleberg, Arne L. and Aage B. Sørensen. 1979. "Sociology of Labor Markets." Annual Review of Sociology 5:351 379.
- Kalleberg, Arne L. and Mark E. Van Buren. 1996. "Is Bigger Better?: Explaining the Relationship Between Organization Size and Job Rewards." American Sociological Review 61:47–66.
- Kalleberg, Arne L., Michael Wallace, and Robert P. Althauser. 1981. "Economic Segmentation, Worker Power, and Income Inequality." American Journal of Sociology 87:651 683.
- Lincoln, James R. and Arne L. Kalleberg. 1985. "Work Organizations and Workforce Commitment: A Study of Plants and Employees in the U.S. and Japan," American Sociological Review 50(6):738 760.
- Mouw, Ted and Arne L. Kalleberg. 2010. “Occupations and the Structure of Wage Inequality in the United States, 1980s-2000s.” American Sociological Review 75(3): 402–431
- Sørensen, Aage B. and Arne L. Kalleberg. 1981. "An Outline for a Theory of the Matching of Persons to Jobs." Pp. 49 74 in Ivar Berg (editor), Sociological Perspectives on Labor Markets. New York: Academic Press.
