= Kathleen Gerson =

American sociologist (born 1947)

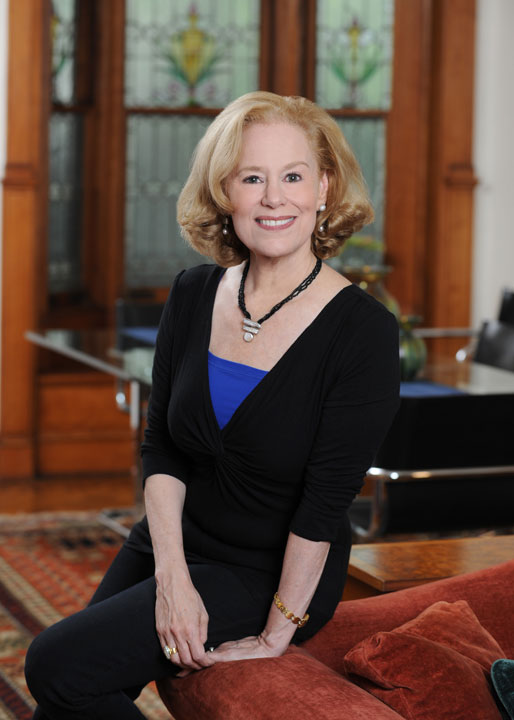
- Kathleen Gerson
- Born: August 6, 1947 (age 79)
- Education: Stanford University (BA, 1969); University of California, Berkeley (MA, 1974; PhD, 1981)
- Known for: Qualitative studies of gender, work-family balance, and social change
- Awards: Guggenheim Fellowship (2017); Jessie Bernard Award (2013); Distinguished Merit Award, Eastern Sociological Society (2014); William J. Goode Distinguished Book Award (2012); Top Scholar, ScholarGPS (2024)
- Scientific career
- Institutions: New York University
- Thesis: Hard Choices: How Women Decide About Work, Career, and Motherhood (1981)
- Doctoral advisor: Harold L. Wilensky; Arlie Russell Hochschild; Claude S. Fischer
- Website: www.kathleengerson.com

Kathleen Gerson (born August 6, 1947) is an American sociologist and Collegiate Professor of Arts and Science at New York University. She specializes in qualitative interview-based research on the intersections of gender, work, and family in contemporary economies, examining how individuals navigate shifting gender dynamics, work-family conflict, and evolving employment and caregiving institutions.

Her major books include Hard Choices (1985), No Man's Land (1993), The Time Divide (2004, co-authored with Jerry A. Jacobs), The Unfinished Revolution (2010), and The Science and Art of Interviewing (2020, co-authored with Sarah Damaske). She has received numerous honors, including the Guggenheim Fellowship (2017), the Jessie Bernard Award (2013), and the William J. Goode Distinguished Book Award (2012). Gerson is widely cited for her analyses of how institutional barriers shape personal strategies amid broader social and economic change.

As of 2026, she is working on a book examining workers’ and parents’ responses to the intensifying collisions between earning and caregiving in the new economy.

== Education and career ==
Gerson earned her B.A. magna cum laude in sociology from Stanford University in 1969, where she was elected to Phi Beta Kappa. She received her M.A. in 1974 and Ph.D. in 1981 from the Department of Sociology at the University of California, Berkeley, with a thesis titled "Hard Choices: How Women Decide About Work, Career, and Motherhood," advised by Harold L. Wilensky, Arlie Russell Hochschild, and Claude S. Fischer.

She joined New York University's Department of Sociology as an assistant professor in 1980, rising to associate professor in 1988, full professor in 1995, and Collegiate Professor of Arts and Science in 2010. She served as director of undergraduate studies (1990–1996) and department chair (2000–2003).

Gerson has held visiting fellowships at the Center for Advanced Study in the Behavioral Sciences at Stanford (2011–2012), the University of Bremen (1995), and the Russell Sage Foundation (1987–1988).

She has held leadership roles in the American Sociological Association (vice president, 2016–2017), Sociologists for Women in Society (co-president, 2015), the Eastern Sociological Society (president, 2008–2009), and the ASA Family Section (chair, 2001–2002). She is a founding board member of the Work and Family Researchers Network and a past board member of the Council on Contemporary Families.

== Research ==
Gerson's work combines in-depth qualitative interviewing with quantitative analysis to show how economic and policy contexts shape individual decisions about work, parenting, and relationships-and how those decisions, in turn, drive larger social change.

Hard Choices (1985) demonstrated that women's employment and motherhood decisions are strategic adaptations to opportunities and partnership uncertainties rather than fixed traits.

No Man's Land (1993) documented men's varied and often polarized responses to gender change.

The Time Divide (2004, with Jerry A. Jacobs) used national data to reveal time polarization as a driver of gender inequality and proposed policy reforms for better work-family integration; it was named among the decade's most influential books on family change by Contemporary Sociology.

The Unfinished Revolution (2010) revealed a gap between young adults' egalitarian ideals and "fallback" strategies created by institutional barriers-women turning toward self-reliance and men toward neo-traditional roles. It has been described in scholarly reviews as a landmark study of generational change. The book received the ASA Family Section's William J. Goode Distinguished Book Award.

The Science and Art of Interviewing (2020, with Sarah Damaske) offers a methodological guide to in-depth interviewing.

Recent projects include national studies (with Jennifer Glass, Jerry A. Jacobs, and Barbara Risman) on caregiving during the COVID-19 pandemic and related publications on gender, parenting, and remote work. Her research incorporates cross-national comparisons and informs policy discussions on gender equity.

== Awards and honors ==
- Top Scholar, ScholarGPS (top 0.5% worldwide lifetime ranking), 2024
- Guggenheim Fellowship, John Simon Guggenheim Memorial Foundation, 2017
- Distinguished Career Award, ASA Family Section, 2017
- Jessie Bernard Award, American Sociological Association, 2013
- Distinguished Merit Award, Eastern Sociological Society, 2014
- William J. Goode Distinguished Book Award (for The Unfinished Revolution), ASA Family Section, 2012
- Rosabeth Moss Kanter Award for Excellence in Work-Family Research (with Jerry A. Jacobs), 2002

== Selected publications ==
=== Books ===
- Gerson, Kathleen; Damaske, Sarah A. (2020). The Science and Art of Interviewing. Oxford University Press. doi:10.1093/oso/9780199324290.001.0001. ISBN 978-0-19-932429-3.
- Gerson, Kathleen (2010). The Unfinished Revolution: Coming of Age in a New Era of Gender, Work, and Family. Oxford University Press. doi:10.1093/acprof:oso/9780199783328.001.0001. ISBN 978-0-19-978332-8.
- Jacobs, Jerry A.; Gerson, Kathleen (2004). The Time Divide: Work, Family, and Gender Inequality. Harvard University Press. ISBN 978-0674018396.
- Gerson, Kathleen (1993). No Man's Land: Men's Changing Commitments to Family and Work. Basic Books. ISBN 978-0465063161.
- Gerson, Kathleen (1985). Hard Choices: How Women Decide About Work, Career, and Motherhood. University of California Press. doi:10.1525/9780520908573. ISBN 978-0-520-05745-6.

=== Selected journal articles ===
- Jacobs, Jerry A.; Gerson, Kathleen (2001). "Overworked Individuals or Overworked Families? Explaining Trends in Work, Leisure, and Family Time". Work and Occupations. 28 (1): 40-63. doi:10.1177/0730888401028001003.
- Gerson, Kathleen (2002). "Moral Dilemmas, Moral Strategies, and the Transformation of Gender: Lessons from Two Generations of Work and Family Change". Gender & Society. 16 (1): 8-28. doi:10.1177/0891243202016001002.
- Dunatchik, Allison; Gerson, Kathleen; Glass, Jennifer; Jacobs, Jerry A. (2022). "Gender, Parenting, and The Rise of Remote Work During the Pandemic: Implications for Domestic Inequality in the United States". Gender & Society. 36 (1): 71-101. doi:10.1177/08912432211002308.
- Gerson, Kathleen (2023). "Why No One Can 'Have It All' and Why That Matters to Everyone". Sociological Forum. 38 (1): 1-22. doi:10.1111/socf.12959.
