= Hyperselectivity =

Immigration phenomenon

Hyperselectivity is a concept in sociology that describes a pattern within immigration where migrants are more highly educated and advantaged socioeconomically than the general population in their country of origin. This can also apply to the population of the host country. This concept has been widely used in research on Asian Americans in explaining the phenomenon of social mobility, inequality, and educational attainment. Scholars such as Jennifer Lee and Min Zhou have highlighted the effects of hyperselectivity when shaping the experiences of specific Asian immigrant groups in the United States.

== Definition and origin ==
Hyperselectivity refers to a form of "dual positive selection," meaning, immigrants are disproportionately selected from the most educated and socioeconomically advanced places of their origin country. This concept originated from sociological research drawn from immigration and inequality specifically, focusing on studies examining the differences in outcomes across immigrant groups.

This concept is typically associated with research among the Asian American populations, where scholars have used it to explain why some groups experiences high levels of occupational success and academic achievement.

== Historical context ==
The rise of hyperselective immigration patterns across Asian American groups are linked to the changes in U.S. immigration policy, specifically the Immigration and Nationality Act of 1965. This policy, signed by President Lyndon B. Johnson on October 3, 1965, abolished the restrictive national-origins quota system that favored northern and Western European immigrants since the 1920s. This policy showed preference for highly skilled workers and family reunification.

This resulted in many immigrants from countries such as India, South Korea, and China to enter the United States through an employment-based visa that favored certain individuals with professional skills and high education. These policy changes led to the overrepresentation of these highly skilled and educated individuals among certain Asian immigrant groups.

== Hyperselectivity in Asian-American communities ==
Research has provided insight on several Asian American groups such as Chinese, Indian, and Korean Americans that exhibit patterns of hyperselectivity. Often, immigrants from these groups hold higher levels of education than nonimmigrants of their countries of origin, as well as the U.S. population as a whole.

The effects of this selective migration has contributed to now high levels of educational attainment with second-generation Asian Americans. Children that grow up in households of hyperselective immigrants are more likely to achieve and access educational resources, stable economic conditions, and comfort within academic institutions.

== Mechanisms and effects ==
Multiple mechanisms are produced through the social influences of hyperselectivity. Highly educated immigrants are shown to place high strain on academic achievement and invest significant resources in their children's education. These factors often include test preparation, tutoring, special testing, and enrollment into academically rigorous or prestigious institutions.

Hyperselectivity can also produce broader effects in the community. With the concentration of highly educated individuals within specific immigrant communities, formations of social networks form and can reinforce certain academic expectations and norms. The networks within these communities may offer information, support systems, and educational resources to help academic success.

== Relation to the model minority stereotype ==
Interpretations of the stereotype "model minority" has often been complicated by the concept of hyperselectivity. This phenomenon describes the Asian American communities as uniformly successful on an academic and professional level. While scholars argue high levels of educational success of Asian American groups are correlated to cultural values, other argues that the immigration selectivity also plays a significant role in shaping these outcomes.

However, with the emphasis on selection processes and immigration policy, hyperselectivity has shifted attention away from cultural aspects, focusing more on roles of institutions and historical contexts.

== Limitations and critiques ==
Scholars have noted multiple limitations to the concept of hyperselectivity. Not every Asian American group is hyperselected. Refugee populations, such as Vietnamese and Cambodian Americans often arrive to the U.S. with fewer economic and educational resources.

Research has discovered barriers to advancement among Asian American groups, indicating discrimination and an occurrence called "bamboo ceiling," which limits the access to leadership positions in the workforce.

Scholars Arthur Sakamoto and Sharon Xuanren Wang wrote: "Hyper-selectivity ignores accumulated facts about Asian American family processes relating to cultural factors and educational attainment. Rather than being a class phenomenon, Asian cultural factors have important effects for most second-generation Asian Americans regardless of the socioeconomic status of their parents. Overemphasizing hyper-selectivity inadequately acknowledges the cultural heritage of Asian Americans and ignores the agency of immigrant Asian American families."

== See also ==
- Model minority
- Immigration to the United States
- Social stratification
- Educational inequality
- Bamboo ceiling
