= The Tolls of Uncertainty =

2021 sociology book

- Author: Sarah Damaske
- Publisher: Princeton University Press
- Pages: 320
- ISBN: 978-0-691-20014-9

The Tolls of Uncertainty: How Privilege and the Guilt Gap Shape Unemployment in America is a 2021 sociology book by Sarah Damaske, published by Princeton University Press. The book is about how gender and social class shape experiences of unemployment in the United States.

In Social Forces, Pilar Gonalons-Pons discussed the book's examination of gender, class and unemployment, and its relevance to research on economic inequality. Christine L. Williams reviewed the book in Gender & Society and discussed how experiences of unemployment differed across gender and social class. Luís L. M. Aguiar reviewed the book in the American Journal of Sociology. Andrew Mannheimer also reviewed it in Teaching Sociology.
