= Devey =

Devey is a surname. Notable people with the surname include:

- George Devey (1820–1886), English architect
- Harry Devey (1864–1940), English footballer
- Hilary Devey (1957–2022), English businesswoman and television personality
- Jack Devey (1866–1940), English footballer and cricketer
- Jordan Devey (born 1988), American football player
- Phil Devey (born 1977), Canadian baseball player
- Ray Devey (1917–2001), English footballer
- Ted Devey (1871–1945), English footballer
- Will Devey (1865–1935), English footballer

== See also ==
- Donald Tomaskovic-Devey (born 1957), American sociologist
