= Sarah Mustillo =

American sociologist

- Born: Sarah Anne Kahler; Pennsylvania, U.S.

Academic background
- Education: University of Notre Dame (BA); Duke University (MA, PhD)
- Thesis: Discrimination as a psychosocial determinant of the black/white difference in maternal health, preterm delivery, and low birth weight (2001)

Academic work
- Institutions: Duke University; University of Notre Dame

Sarah Anne Mustillo (née Kahler) is an American sociologist. She is the Dean of the Notre Dame College of Arts and Letters. Mustillo's research interests include health, statistics, children and youth, social psychology, gender and family. Her work includes contributions on longitudinal data, discrete outcomes, model specification, and missing data.

== Early life and education ==
Mustillo was born to parents Gary and Susan Kahler in Illinois. She attended Marple Newton High School before enrolling at the University of Notre Dame for her bachelor's degree. Upon graduating magna cum laude from Notre Dame in 1996, Mustillo enrolled at Duke University for her master's degree and PhD in sociology. As a PhD student, Mustillo received the $2000 Woodrow Wilson Johnson & Johnson Dissertation grant. Upon graduating in 2001, Mustillo received the Vorsanger-Smith Scholar Award for overall excellence in Duke's sociology graduate program.

== Career ==
Upon completing her PhD, Mustillo remained at Duke as an assistant professor in their psychiatry department. In this role, she continued her research on the social aspects of mental disorders and examined the mental health of overweight girls. In 2007, Mustillo left Duke and became an associate professor of Sociology at Purdue University. At Purdue, Mustillo published a study which found that weight loss did not correlate to better self-esteem in white and black girls. In 2012, her co-authored paper "Children of Misfortune: Early Adversity and Cumulative Inequality in Perceived Life Trajectories," received the American Sociological Associations Outstanding Publication Award in the Aging and the Life Course section. In 2013 she was named a University Faculty Scholar and won a fellowship from the Center for Undergraduate Instructional Excellence to allow her to research her project "Revealing the Power of Data." The following year, Mustillo was promoted to the rank of Full professor and left Purdue for the Sociology department at the University of Notre Dame.

Mustillo was appointed co-editor-in-chief of the American Sociological Review in 2015 alongside Rory M. McVeigh and Omar Lizardo. In 2018, Mustillo succeeded John McGreevy as Dean of the Notre Dame College of Arts and Letters.

== Personal life ==
Mustillo married her husband Thomas in 1997. Mustillo and her husband are also avid runners and she completed the 2013 Boston Marathon with a time of three hours and 15 minutes.
