= Larry Isaac =

American sociologist

- Born: Cleveland, Ohio, United States

Academic background
- Education: BS, 1971, MS, 1974, University of Akron; PhD, 1979, Indiana University Bloomington
- Thesis: The Political Economy of Insurgency, State Expenditures, and Income Distribution: A Comparative Panel Analysis, 1948-1970 (1979)

Academic work
- Institutions: Florida State University, Vanderbilt University
- Notable students: Jonathan Coley, Anna Jacobs, Quan Mai

Larry W. Isaac is an American sociologist, the Gertrude Conaway Vanderbilt Distinguished Professor of Sociology and Political Economy at Vanderbilt University.

== Early life and education ==
Isaac was born in Cleveland, Ohio, graduated from Avon High School west of Cleveland, and received a B.S. in Industrial Management and M.A. in sociology from the University of Akron. He did his doctoral work and received the Ph.D. in sociology from Indiana University Bloomington.

== Career ==
Isaac began his professorial career at Florida State University in 1978 where he rose through the academic ranks to become the Mildred and Claude Pepper Distinguished Professor. He joined the Sociology Department at Vanderbilt University in 2004, where he is now the Gertrude Conaway Vanderbilt Distinguished Professor (endowed chair) of Sociology & Political Economy. He served as the Sociology Department Chair at Vanderbilt from 2015 to 2021.

From 2010 to 2015, Isaac served as senior editor of the American Sociological Review, the flagship scientific journal of the American Sociological Association. He also previously served as president of the Southern Sociological Society from 2007 to 2008 and received the Distinguished Lectureship Award from the Southern Sociological Society in 2011.

Isaac has published extensively in the fields of political sociology, political economy, social movements, labor studies, and historical processes of social change. He is known for his published work in three major areas: (i) political economy of labor movements and class formation processes; (ii) civil rights and black liberation movement dynamics; and (iii) methodological approaches to incorporating qualitative events and turning points into quantitative models of social-historical change.

Isaac's publications have received three awards from the American Sociological Association (in Comparative-Historical Sociology, Culture, and Labor Movements). In recognition of his accomplishments in research, he was elected into the national honorary research society, Sociological Research Association, in 2014.

== Partial bibliography ==
- Isaac, Larry W., and William Kelly. 1981. “Racial Insurgency, the State, and Welfare Expansion.” American Journal of Sociology 86(6): pages 1348–1386.
- Isaac, Larry W., and Larry Griffin. 1989. “Ahistoricism in Time-Series Analysis of Historical Process: Critique, Redirection, and Illustrations from U.S. Labor History.” American Sociological Review 54(6): pages 873–890.
- Isaac, Larry W. 1997. “Transforming Localities: Reflections on Time, Causality, and Narrative in Contemporary Historical Sociology.” Historical Methods 30(4): pages 4–12.
- Isaac, Larry W. 2002. “To Counter ‘the Very Devil’ and More: The Making of Independent Capitalist Militia in Gilded Age America.” American Journal of Sociology 108(2): pages 353-405.
- Isaac, Larry W., and Lars Christiansen. 2002. "How the Civil Rights Movement Revitalized Labor Militancy." American Sociological Review 67(5): pages 722–746.
- Isaac, Larry W., Steve McDonald, and Greg Lukasik. 2006. “Takin' it from the Streets: How the Sixties Mass Movement Revitalized Unionization.” American Journal of Sociology 112(1): pages 46–96.
- Isaac, Larry W. 2008. “Movement of Movements: Culture Moves in the Long Civil Rights Struggle.” Social Forces 87(1): pages 33–63.
- Isaac, Larry W. 2009. “Movements, Aesthetics, and Markets in Literary Change: Making the American Labor Problem Novel.” American Sociological Review 74(6): 938–965.
- Isaac, Larry W., Jonathan S. Coley, Daniel B. Cornfield, and Dennis C. Dickerson. 2016. “Preparation Pathways and Movement Participation: Insurgent Schooling and Nonviolent Direct Action in the Nashville Civil Rights Movement.” Mobilization 21(2): pages 155–176.
- Isaac, Larry W., Anna W. Jacobs, Jaime Kucinskas, and Allison R. McGrath. 2020. “Social Movement Schools: Sites for Consciousness Transformation, Training, and Prefigurative Social Development.” Social Movement Studies 19(2): pages 160–182.
- Isaac, Larry W., Jonathan S. Coley, Daniel B. Cornfield, and Dennis C. Dickerson. 2020. “Pathways to Modes of Movement Participation: Micromobilization in the Nashville Civil Rights Movement.” Social Forces 99(1): pages 255–280.
- Isaac, Larry W., Rachel G. McKane, and Anna W. Jacobs. 2022. “Pitting the Working-Class Against Itself: Solidarity, Strikebreaking, and Strike Outcomes in the Early U.S. Labor Movement.” Social Science History 46(2): pages 315–348.
- Isaac, Larry W., Jonathan S. Coley, Quan D. Mai, and Anna W. Jacobs. 2022. “Striking News: Discursive Power of the Press as Capitalist Resource in Gilded Age Strikes.” American Journal of Sociology 127(5): pages 1602–1663.
