= Karen A. Cerulo =

American sociologist

- Born: January 25, 1957 (age 69); Perth Amboy, New Jersey
- Education: Rutgers University (B.A.); Princeton University (Ph.D.)
- Scientific career
- Fields: Sociology
- Workplaces: Rutgers University

Karen A. Cerulo (born January 25, 1957, in Perth Amboy, New Jersey) is an American sociologist specializing in the study of culture, communication and cognition. Currently, she is a professor emeritus of Sociology at Rutgers University and working as an active consultant and mentor. She is the former editor of Sociological Forum, the flagship journal of the Eastern Sociological Society. From 2009 to 2010, she served as the Chair of the American Sociological Association's Culture section, and since 1999, she has directed the section's Culture and Cognition Network. Her book Identity Designs: The Sights and Sounds of a Nation won the section's award for the best book of 1996 and her article "Scents and Sensibilities: Olfaction, Sense-making and Meaning Attribution" won the section's 2019 Clifford Geertz Prize for Best Article. Her co-authored book Dreams of a Lifetime: How Who We Are Shapes How We Imagine Our Future (with Janet M. Ruane) won the section's Mary Douglas Best Book Award in 2023. Cerulo is a former Vice President of the Eastern Sociological Society. In 2013, she was named the Robin M. Williams Jr. Lecturer by the Eastern Sociological Society; she won that organization's Merit Award in the same year. In 2019, she was elected to the Sociological Research Association.

== Background ==
Cerulo earned her B.A. from Rutgers University, graduating summa cum laude in 1980. She received her M.A. (1983) and Ph.D. (1985) in sociology from Princeton University. Her dissertation was titled "Social Solidarity and Its Effects on Musical Communication: An Empirical Analysis Of National Anthems." She graduated with departmental honors.

Cerulo was an assistant professor of sociology at Stony Brook University from 1985 to 1990. She joined the faculty of Rutgers University in the fall of 1990. In 1994, she received the School of Arts and Sciences' "Award for Distinguished Contributions to Undergraduate Education." In 2012, she won the university's "Scholar-Teacher Award", an honor bestowed on faculty persons who have made outstanding contributions in both research and teaching. She chaired the Rutgers sociology department from 2009 to 2012.

== Scholarship ==
Much of Cerulo's work revolves around symbol systems and their role in communication. She studies both verbal and nonverbal systems, including language, music, graphic images, and scents. While most people focus on the content of symbols, Cerulo prioritizes symbolic structure. She defines symbolic structure as the spatial or temporal organization of a symbol's constituent parts—i.e. the ways in which colors and shapes are combined in visual images or notes, sounds, odors or words are temporally sequenced in musical, olfactory or verbal messages. Cerulo argues that structure, like content, carries meaning for those creating and receiving symbol based messages. Therefore, it is important to understand how symbolic structure resonates with those involved in the communication process. Cerulo unfolds this agenda in several articles and two of her books: Identity Designs: The Sights and Sounds of a Nation and Deciphering Violence: The Cognitive Structure of Right and Wrong. These works highlight two important findings. First, Cerulo shows that certain symbolic structures are associated with predictable reactions from those receiving messages. By uncovering and understanding these patterns, she argues, one can greatly enhance communication effectiveness. Second, she demonstrates that symbol structures vary in predictable ways according to the sociocultural conditions under which they are produced or projected. Contextual factors such as cultural heterogeneity, political or social stability, existing power structures, dominant systems of economic exchange, professional norms of expression, the nature of social ties, or levels of "collective focus" are all associated with certain variants of symbolic structure. (Collective focus is a concept developed by Cerulo to gauge the points of attention to which a collective body is directed at a given moment; others have since utilized the term.) Some describe Cerulo's work on symbolic communication as a "demonstration of research ingenuity," one that "makes important contributions to debates about meaning and measurement." Moreover, "her answers to questions of how rather than what symbols communicate merit the attention of all scholars working in the sociology of culture and symbolic anthropology."

In line with her interest in symbolic communication, Cerulo has developed a number of quantitative indicators that capture the essence of symbol structures. For example, her measures of musical structure capture elements of melodic, harmonic and rhythmic motion, ornamentation and dissonance. Her measures of graphic images capture levels of density, contrast and distortion. In dealing with scents, she measures the diversity, contrast and temporal ordering of scent components. These measures allow one to classify the relative complexity of symbol structures. As a result, Cerulo's measures make cultural objects such as paintings, logos, anthems, songs, even perfumes accessible sources of social science data, amenable to the field's most rigorous analytic methods. The development of these measures earned Cerulo recognition as "a methodological pioneer in symbolic research."

In addition to studying the tools of communication, Cerulo is also interested in communication media. She has written extensively on the ways in which new communication technologies can change definitions and perceptions of social actors, social groups, and appropriate sites of action. She also problematizes the distinction between direct and mediated communication and she explores the contexts in which social connectedness and social cohesion develop in lieu of physical co-presence. Her latest work explores perceived interactions with the dead. Her work "presents a sophisticated typology of forms of interaction which goes beyond simple dichotomies like direct vs. mediated."

In recent years, Cerulo has worked to establish a dialog between cognitive neuroscience and cognitive sociology. Her edited collection, Culture in Mind: Toward a Sociology of Culture and Cognition, as well as several review pieces suggest viable links between these disciplines' approach to conceptualization and schematization, habituation and attention, nurturance and attachment, cognitive styles, and memory storage. Cerulo's book Never Saw It Coming: Cultural Challenges to Envisioning the Worst also forwarded this agenda. In it, she builds on two cognitive scientific ideas, prototyping and graded membership, to explain a sociocultural phenomenon she calls "positive asymmetry"—i.e. a blind optimism associated with a disregard for worst-case scenarios. Cerulo's work documents the widespread nature of positive asymmetry, tracking its influence in key events in the life cycle, the sites of work and play, and in the organizations and bureaucracies that structure social life. She shows that while definitions of best and worst change over time and place, the tendency to prioritize the best is rather constant. Most communities maintain cultural practices (what she calls "eclipsing", "clouding" and "recasting") that background materials dealing with worst-cases or negative concepts. Her work also identifies certain structural conditions under which these cultural practices are more or less likely to be used." In a daring extrapolation, Cerulo argues that this individual grading is recapitulated in cultural cognition." She suggests that the cultural practices associated with positive asymmetry harness the brain's propensity toward asymmetrical thinking. The practices take the mechanic of human brain operations and encode that process into a much more targeted and specialized experiential bias. Cerulo's work concludes by reviewing both the helpful and debilitating consequences of positive asymmetry. She also questions whether this highly entrenched phenomenon can ever (or should ever) be corrected. Organizations expert Karl Weick says of the book, "This book is a welcome addition to an already growing literature on worst cases … What Cerulo adds to this mix is a mechanism, a catalog of cultural practices that make it difficult for people to envision the worst, a broader range of settings in which this imbalance plays out, initial efforts to characterize settings where negative symmetry is acceptable and encouraged, insistence that the unique details of worst cases are what is important, and a solid grounding at the individual level of analysis with the cognitive principle of 'graded membership'." Journalist Barbara Ehrenreich called the book "remarkable" as it "recounts a number of ways that the habit of positive thinking … undermined preparedness and invited disaster." The book was the topic of an "Author Meets Critics" session at the 2008 Annual Meeting of the American Sociological Association. In an effort to spotlight Cerulo's critiques of the optimism agendas forwarded in books such as Rhonda Byrne's The Secret, writer John Gravois initiated a campaign in Slate magazine to have Cerulo interviewed on The Oprah Winfrey Show." The Secret tells us to visualize best-case scenarios and banish negative ones from our minds," wrote Gravois. "Never Saw It Coming says that's what we've been doing all along—and we get blindsided by even the most foreseeable disasters because of it."

Cerulo continues this line of research in her book, Dreams of a Lifetime: How Who We Are Shapes How We Imagine Our Future (with Janet M. Ruane). In this book (and other articles), Cerulo and Ruane note that we are all free to dream about the future. But using interviews and focus groups, they show that where a person stands in social space—i.e. their social class, race, gender, stage of life, or encounters with disruptive live events—patterns people's dreams and deposits both possibilities and obstacles into one's mind, influencing what and how people dream, whether people embrace dreaming or simply give up on it. By exploring people's future imaginings, Cerulo and Ruane uncover a new dimension of inequality—inequality ingrained in mind and body well before action or outcome unfold. According to Sherry Turkle, "For those who like to see America as a field of dreams writ large, this book is tonic. Cerulo and Ruane correct the record on dreaming, revealing why it is not an equal opportunity activity. Engrossing."

== Accolades ==
- 2023 Mary Douglas Award for Best Book from the ASA Sociology of Culture Section for Dreams of a Lifetime: How Who We Are Shapes How We Imagine the Future.
- 2019 Clifford Geertz Award (Best Article) from the ASA Sociology of Culture Section for "Scents and sensibility: olfaction, sense-making, and meaning attribution."
- 2013 The Robin M. Williams Jr. Lectureship: Awarded by the Eastern Sociological Society in recognition of Distinguished Scholarship.
- 1996. The American Sociological Association Culture Section's Best Book Award for Identity Designs: The Sights and Sounds of a Nation.

== Selected publications ==
- Cerulo, Karen A. (2023). "Enduring Relationships: Social Aspects of Perceived Interactions with the Dead." Socius 9: 23780231231203658.
- Cerulo, Karen A. and Janet M. Ruane. (2022). Dreams of a Lifetime: How Who We Are Shapes How We Imagine Our Future. Princeton University Press. ISBN 978-0-691-22909-6
- Cerulo, Karen A., Vanina Leschziner, and Hana Shepherd. 2021. "Rethinking Culture and Cognition." Annual Review of Sociology 47: 63–85.
- Cerulo, Karen A. (2018). "Scents and Sensibilities: Olfaction, Sense-making and Meaning Attribution." American Sociological Review 83(2): 361–389.
- Cerulo, Karen and Janet M. Ruane. (2014) "Apologies of the Rich and Famous: Social, Cultural and Cognitive Explanations of Why We Care and Why We Forgive." Social Psychology Quarterly 77: 2: 123–149.
- Cerulo, Karen A. (2010) "Mining the Intersections of Cognitive Sociology and Neuroscience." Poetics 38: 2: 115–132.
- Cerulo, Karen A. (2009) "Non-Humans in Social Interaction." Annual Review of Sociology vol. 35: 531–552.
- Cerulo, Karen A. (2006) Never Saw It Coming: Cultural Challenges to Envisioning the Worst. Chicago: University of Chicago Press. ISBN 0226100332.
- Cerulo, Karen A. (2002) Culture in Mind: Toward A Sociology of Culture and Cognition. New York/London: Routledge. ISBN 041592944X.
- Cerulo, Karen A. (1998) Deciphering Violence: The Cognitive Structure of Right and Wrong. New York/London: Routledge. ISBN 0415917999.
- Cerulo, Karen A. and Ruane, Janet M. (1998) "Coming Together: New Taxonomies for the Analysis of Social Relations." Sociological Inquiry 68: 3: 398–425.
- Cerulo, Karen A. (1995) Identity Designs: The Sights and Sounds of A Nation. The Arnold and Caroline Rose Book Series of the American Sociological Association. New Brunswick, NJ: Rutgers University Press. ISBN 0813522110.
