= Rory M. McVeigh =

American sociologist

Rory McVeigh
- Born: 1959 (age 66–67)
- Education: University of Arizona (B.A.); University of North Carolina, Chapel Hill (Ph.D.)
- Known for: social movements, political sociology
- Spouse: Mim Thomas
- Scientific career
- Fields: Sociology
- Workplaces: University of Notre Dame
- Doctoral advisor: Peter Bearman
- Notable students: Austin Choi-Fitzpatrick

Rory M. McVeigh is an American sociologist, Nancy Reeves Dreux Chair professor of sociology and director of the Center for the Study of Social Movements and former chair (2007–2016) of the department of sociology at the University of Notre Dame. From 2015 through 2020 he served as one of the lead editors of the American Sociological Review, the flagship journal of the American Sociological Association. He is widely cited in the field of social movements, particularly right-wing movements. He also edited the academic journal Mobilization from 2008 through 2015 and is the current the co-editor of the academic blog Mobilizing Ideas. McVeigh will be the 2028 president of the American Sociological Association.

== Career ==
McVeigh received his bachelor's in sociology from the University of Arizona in 1991 before moving on to University of North Carolina, Chapel Hill, where he received a master's in sociology 1993 and a Ph.D. in sociology in 1996. During his time at Chapel Hill, McVeigh was an associate editor of the academic journal Social Forces. He also met his wife, Mim Thomas, another sociologist, during his time at Chapel Hill. He then took the position as assistant professor of sociology at Skidmore College from 1997 through 2002 and then at the University of Notre Dame. At Notre Dame, he was promoted to associate professor with tenure in 2005 and to full professor in 2009. In 2017, he became the Nancy Reeves Dreux Chair Professor of sociology.

McVeigh's 2008 co-authored article Red Counties, Blue Counties, and Occupational Segregation by Sex and Race received an honorable mention for the 2008 American Sociological Association Political Sociology Best Article Award.

McVeigh's book, entitled The Rise of the Ku Klux Klan: Right-Wing Movements and National Politics was published by the University of Minnesota Press in 2009. The book went on to be reviewed by over a dozen academic journals and news outlets. According to reviewers Heidi Beirich and Kevin Hicks, "The work offers a sophisticated new explanation of the quick rise of an organization that, at its height, numbered more than three million."

In 2009, McVeigh became the editor of the academic journal Mobilization: An International Quarterly a post he held until 2015.

Along with co-editors Omar Lizardo, and Sarah Mustillo, McVeigh edited the American Sociological Review from 2015 to 2020, the flagship journal of the American Sociological Association.

McVeigh's second book, entitled The Politics of Losing: Trump, the Klan, and the Mainstreaming of Resentment, was published by Columbia University Press in 2019.

In May 2026, McVeigh was elected as the 2028 president of the American Sociological Association. McVeigh received 51% of votes cast, the next nearest candidate Melissa J. Wilde received 37%. During his campaign for ASA presidency, McVeigh said: "The ASA has a vital role to play in continuing its extraordinary defense of sociology against unprecedented political attacks".
