= Damaske =

Damaske is a surname. Notable people with the surname include:

- Magdalena Damaske (born 1996), Polish volleyball player
- Sarah Damaske, American sociologist
- Tanja Damaske (born 1971), German javelin thrower
