= Jerry A. Jacobs =

American sociologist (born 1955)

Jerry A. Jacobs (born February 7, 1955) is an American sociologist noted for his work on women, work, and family. He is professor of sociology at the University of Pennsylvania, where he has taught since earning his Ph.D. in sociology at Harvard in 1983. (Note: Jerry A. Jacobs' publications are sometimes mistaken for those of Syracuse University sociologist Jerry Jacobs; they can be distinguished by their respective Library of Congress catalog entries.) His webpage includes links to many of his published articles as well as an essay on growing up at his parents' hotel (The Delmar) in the Catskill Mountains.

At Penn, Jacobs has been affiliated with a number of departments and programs, including the Graduate School of Education, the Leonard Davis Institute for Health Economics, the Management Department at the Wharton School, the Population Studies Center, and the Women's Studies Program.

Jacobs has served as the Editor of the American Sociological Review, President of the Eastern Sociological Society, and Founding President of the Work and Family Researchers Network (WFRN).

Professor Jacobs’ studies have addressed a number of aspects of women's employment, including authority, earnings, working conditions, part-time work and work-family conflict, and entry into male-dominated occupations.

Professor Jacobs has published six books, over 85 research papers, and 19 book reviews. His research has appeared in prominent academic journals, including the American Sociological Review, the American Journal of Sociology and the Annual Review of Sociology.

He has received 34 grants to support his research from diverse sources, including the Andrew W. Mellon Foundation, the Alfred P. Sloan Foundation, the Atlantic Philanthropies, the Josiah Macy Jr. Foundation, the Spencer Foundation, the National Science Foundation, and the Robert Wood Johnson Foundation.

He is the recipient of the Max Weber award from the American Sociological Association. He has also received the Work-Life Legacy Award and the Rosabeth Moss Kanter Award for excellence in Work-Family Research.

Jacobs' earliest research focused on the gender segregation of occupations and college majors. Women's concentration in fields that are occupied principally by other women is a major source of gender inequality. Jacobs’ research has tracked the long term persistence of this pattern, but he has also showed that there is more movement between male-dominated, gender-neutral and female-dominated fields than is generally recognized.

Jacobs has also focused considerable research attention on issues related to work and family. Jacobs, along with his co-author Kathleen Gerson, showed that challenges associated with over-work are common for dual-earner, middle-class families, but they also report that less affluent families often struggle to find enough paid work to support their families.

His most recent book, In Defense of Disciplines: Interdisciplinarity and Specialization in the Research University, was published in 2014 by the University of Chicago Press. In this study, Jacobs maintains that academic disciplines are an integral feature of the intellectual division of labor, that academic specialization is ubiquitous, and that there are many paradoxes associated with the effort to make US universities more interdisciplinary.

Jacobs’ current projects include an investigation of the representation of international topics and international authors in US-based social science journals, and an essay on the evolving interconnections between technology, work and family.

His major research focus is a multi-faceted exploration of the future of work. The main theme of this study is a critical reexamination of whether automation will displace large number of workers. A case study focuses on the role of automation in elder care.

== Books ==
- In Defense of Disciplines: Interdisciplinarity and Specialization in the Research University, University of Chicago Press, 2014
- The Changing Face of Medicine, co-authored with Ann Boulis, Cornell University Press, 2008
- Putting Poor People to Work, with several coauthors, Russell Sage Foundation, 2006
- The Time Divide: Work, Family and Gender Inequality, co-authored with Kathleen Gerson, Harvard University Press, 2004
- Gender Inequality at Work (Editor), Beverly Hills, CA: Sage Publications, 1995
- Revolving Doors: Sex Segregation and Women's Careers, Stanford University Press, 1989
