= Howard Odum =

Howard Odum may refer to:

- Howard W. Odum (1884–1954), American sociologist
- Howard T. Odum (1924–2002), his son, ecologist
