= Austin Choi-Fitzpatrick =

American sociologist

- Born: July 2, 1977 (age 49)
- Education: University of Denver (BA); University of Notre Dame (MA, PhD)
- Spouse: Jenny Choi-Fitzpatrick (m. 2004)
- Scientific career
- Fields: Human Rights; Social Movements
- Workplaces: Aspen Institute; Yale University; Kroc School of Peace Studies; University of San Diego; Rights Lab and School of Sociology and Social Policy (University of Nottingham); Central European University(2013-2015)
- Doctoral advisor: Rory M. McVeigh
- Other academic advisors: Christian Davenport

Austin Choi-Fitzpatrick is an American scholar and writer. His work explores the interplay of social, economic, political, and technological forces in the process of social change. He has held visiting positions at Harvard, Oxford, and UCSD, and is currently Scholar in Residence at the Aspen Institute's Global Leadership Network and Co-Director of a Working Group at Yale's Gilder Lehrman Center.

He is Professor of political sociology at the Joan B. Kroc School of Peace Studies at the University of San Diego and concurrent Rights Lab associate professor of social movements and human rights at the University of Nottingham's School of Sociology and Social Policy. He was previously assistant professor of political sociology at the School of Public Policy at Central European University.

Choi-Fitzpatrick holds a PhD in sociology from the University of Notre Dame, where he was Assistant Director at the Center for the Study of Social Movements and Social Change. Prior to academia he worked as a human rights advocate. From 2003 through 2009 he was on staff at Free the Slaves, the sister organization of Anti-Slavery International, itself the world's first and longest-running human rights NGO. He studied human rights and international security at the Josef Korbel School of International Studies at the University of Denver. He has been a visiting scholar at the University of California - San Diego, Oxford, and Yale and is a global fellow at the Center for Media, Data and Society.

== Academic career ==
External videos
- “Austin Choi-Fitzpatrick - Why Cities are Ground Zero for Democracy”, The Atlantic

External videos
- “Austin Choi-Fitzpatrick - We Can Count Crowds Better”, NBC lx

Most of Choi-Fitzpatrick's work, in one form or another, explores social change. In What Slaveholders Think: How Contemporary Perpetrators Rationalize What They Do, Choi-Fitzpatrick argues that slaveholders play an important but overlooked role in shaping the tactics and outcomes of the contemporary abolitionist movement. Taking them seriously, he suggests, advances scholarship on social movements, human rights, and anti-trafficking. Policy implications include the possibility that international development efforts recognize that some of their beneficiaries are also rights violators. Early work along these lines can be found in a volume co-edited with Alison Brysk: From Human Trafficking to Human Rights: Reframing Contemporary Slavery (University of Pennsylvania Press Series on Human Rights).

Recent work on the interplay of politics and technology in the process of technological innovation produced The Good Drone: How Social Movements Democratize Surveillance (MIT Press), in which Choi-Fitzpatrick argues that a host of technologies make contentious politics possible. While social media receives the most attention, a wider range of technology deserve causal credit for shaping socio-political change. A related project undertaken by Choi-Fitzpatrick's Good Drone Lab developed an award-winning method for estimating crowd sizes (NBC lx). These efforts have been featured outlets like Fast Company and Science.

NOTE: The Good Drone has been noted for its path to publication—the book went through an open peer review process and the final publication is to be an open access PDF. It is one of the first books to be both open preview process _and_ open access publication. This process was highlighted in the podcast New Book Network.

== Artistic engagements ==
Choi-Fitzpatrick is the co-founder of Art Builds, a collective that fosters interdisciplinary collaboration in participatory art installations. The collective has exhibited work at the Burning Man art festival, been commissioned to build art by the City of San Diego, and is using virtual reality technology to create mixed digital spaces for real-time artistic collaboration.

== Bibliography ==
=== Books ===
- Wicked Problems: The Ethics of Action for Peace, Rights, and Justice. (2022) Oxford University Press.
- The Good Drone: How Social Movements Democratize Surveillance. (2020) MIT Press.
- What Slaveholders Think: How Contemporary Perpetrators Rationalize What They Do. (2017) Columbia University Press.
- Co-edited with Alison Brysk (2012). From Human Trafficking to Human Rights. University of Pennsylvania Press. Archived from the original on January 24, 2012.
- Drones for Good: How to Bring Sociotechnical Thinking into the Classroom. (2020) Co-authored with Gordon Hoople. Morgan & Claypool.

=== Articles ===
- Scholarly publications can be found at Google Scholar

=== Public writing ===
- Television appearances and public-facing writing can be found at Muckrack
