= Rupert Vance =

American sociologist

Rupert Bayless Vance (15 March 1899 – 25 August 1975) was an American sociologist, demographer, and academic. Vance served as the thirty-fourth president of the American Sociological Association. Vance was considered to be a preeminent sociologist of the American South whose research was widely influential among policymakers and scholars. Vance spent the entirety of his career at the University of North Carolina, Chapel Hill, where he both completed his doctoral work and taught as the Kenan Professor of Sociology until his retirement in 1969.

== Early life and education ==
Vance was born on 15 March 1899 in Plumerville, Arkansas. At age three, Vance contracted polio, which paralyzed both of his legs. Despite this physical impediment, Vance was precocious, learning from his mother to read at the age of four and later developing a broad set of intellectual interests that encompassed art and poetry as well as social science and history. Some accounts of Vance's life attribute his mental acuity and determination to his early experience with the physical setbacks from polio.

Vance enrolled at Henderson-Brown College in Arkansas, graduating with a bachelor's degree in 1920 before completing a master's degree in economics the following year at Vanderbilt University. After his studies at Vanderbilt and prior to his doctoral studies, Vance took a five-year hiatus in which he was employed both as a principal at Talihina Junior High School in Talihina, Oklahoma, and later as an English teacher at South Georgia College in McRae, Georgia. In 1926, Vance enrolled in the sociology Ph.D. program at the University of North Carolina, Chapel Hill graduating in only two years. Vance was attracted to Chapel Hill because of the work of Howard W. Odum and the research being conducted at Odum's Institute for Research in Social Science.

== Career ==
Following his graduation, Vance joined the faculty of the University of North Carolina, Chapel Hill as a professor of sociology and a researcher at the Institute for Research in Social Science. Vance conducted influential demographic research on the American South that sought to explain the region's racial problems and economic underdevelopment.

Vance was an editor of the journal Social Forces beginning 1931, and served as co-editor beginning in 1957 until his retirement in 1969. In 1944, Vance served as president of the American Sociological Association, and was president of the Population Association of America in 1952.

== Personal life ==
Vance married Rheba Usher, a student at the University of North Carolina, in 1930 with whom he later had three sons, David, Donald, and Victor. Rupert was rumored, as the time of his death, to be the oldest living survivor of early childhood polio. Despite his physical disability, Vance used crutches to ambulate around the campus of the University of North Carolina, Chapel Hill. Vance also drove a specialized car until his retirement in 1969.

== Bibliography ==
- Vance, Rupert B. (1929). Human Factors in Cotton Culture: A Study in the Social Geography of the American South. Chapel Hill: The University of North Carolina Press. OCLC 573725.
- Vance, Rupert B. (1932). Human Geography of the South: A Study in Regional Resources and Human Adequacy. Chapel Hill: The University of North Carolina Press. OCLC 290190.
