= Donald Tomaskovic-Devey =

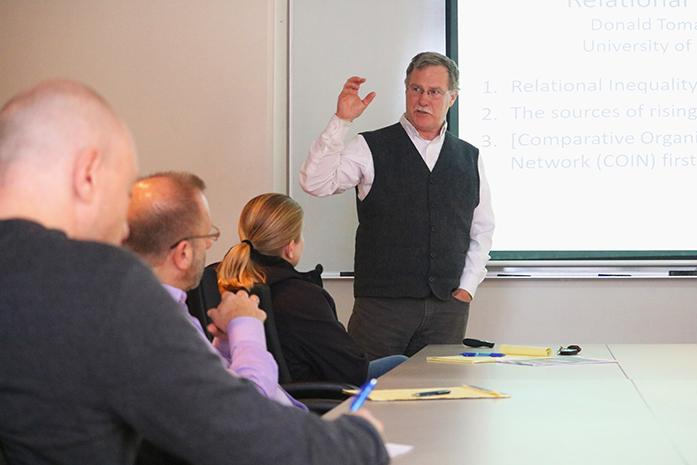
- Donald Tomaskovic-Devey discusses his findings on relational inequalities within smaller communities and global networks in 2016 at the Inequality Seminar, a forum on campus for faculty and graduate students who are interested in inequality broadly defined.
- Born: 1957 (age 68–69)
- Education: Fordham University (B.A., 1979), Boston University (Ph.D., 1984)
- Awards: 2014 Anneliese Maier Research Award from the Alexander von Humboldt Foundation
- Scientific career
- Fields: Sociology
- Institutions: University of Massachusetts Amherst
- Thesis: Good jobs, bad jobs, no jobs: the stratification consequences of U.S. industrial and occupational structure and change, 1960-1980 (1984)

Donald Tomaskovic-Devey (born 1957) is a professor of sociology at the University of Massachusetts Amherst.

== Education ==
Tomaskovic-Devey received his B.A. from Fordham University in 1979 and his Ph.D. from Boston University in 1984, both in sociology.

== Career ==
Tomaskovic-Devey served as a visiting professor at the University of South Carolina for one year (1983-1984) and has held visiting appointments at Stockholm University, Queensland University of Technology, SciencePo, Bielefeld University, and the Copenhagen Business School. He taught at North Carolina State University for 17 years before joining the faculty of the University of Massachusetts Amherst in 2005. As of July 1, 2015, he was also working with the Equal Employment Opportunity Commission to inform its goals and those of other nondiscrimination employment organizations. He was also the president of the Southern Sociological Society for one year (2012-2013). He founded and directs the Center for Employment Equity at the University of Massachusetts Amherst. He is currently co-editor of the American Sociological Review.

== Research ==
Tomaskovic-Devey is known for his research on labor markets and workplace inequality. For example, in 2012, he and Kevin Stainback published the book Documenting Desegregation, in which they noted, among other things, that workplace segregation was ubiquitous in the United States prior to the passage of the Civil Rights Act in 1964. The same book showed that in one-sixth of industries in America, racial segregation between white and black men was increasing. He and Stainback had previously shown (in a 2009 study) that the over-representation of white men among managers in the U.S. had remained virtually unchanged since 1966. His recent work with Dustin Avent-Holt advances a sociological approach to inequality focused on the organizational settings that generate inequality. They propose that there are three primary mechanisms leading to the distribution of respect, resources and rewards – exploitation, closure, and claims making. Mechanisms are contained in organizational inequality regimes and conditioned by human tendencies to view categories of people (e.g. races, educational credentials) within status hierarchies. Mechanisms and categories are seen as dynamically shifting in response to local claims and historical-environmental influences. Tomaskovic-Devey also leads the fifteen-country Comparative Organizational Inequality Network, a large group of social scientists developing the big data capacity of nation state linked employer-employee data to explore contemporary inequality topics. Tomaskovic-Devey co-founded the Center for Employment Equity at the University of Massachusetts.

== Honors and awards ==
In 2023 Tomaskovic-Devey was selected for the Rosabeth Moss Kanter Distinguished Career Award from the American Sociological Association's section on Organizations, Occupations, and Work. Tomaskovic-Devey was elected to the Sociological Research Association in 2006, and was the secretary of the American Sociological Association from 2006 to 2010. He received the Anneliese Maier Research Award from the Alexander von Humboldt Foundation in 2014, the Samuel F. Conti Fellowship from the University of Massachusetts, Amherst in 2016, and the Otto Mønsteds Gæsteprofessorat , Copenhagen Business School in 2022. His papers and books have won multiple awards from the Inequality, Poverty and Mobility and Organizations, Occupations, and Work sections of the American Sociological Association. He has been a visiting faculty appointments in Australia, France, Germany, the Netherlands, Slovenia, Sweden, and Denmark.

== Publications ==
- Recapitalizing America: Alternatives to the Corporate Distortion of National Policy with S.M. Miller (1983)
- Poverty And Social Welfare In The United States (1988)
- Gender & Racial Inequality at Work: The Sources and Consequences of Job Segregation (1993)
- Documenting Desegregation: Racial and Gender Segregation in Private Sector Employment Since the Civil Rights Act with Kevin Stainback (2012)
- Relational Inequalities: An Organizational Approach with Dustin Robert Avent-Holt (2018)
