= John McGreevy =

American historian

Provost of the University of Notre Dame
- Incumbent
- Assumed office July 1, 2022
- Preceded by: Christine Maziar (interim)

Dean of the Notre Dame College of Arts and Letters
- In office July 1, 2008 – July 1, 2018
- Preceded by: Mark W. Roche
- Succeeded by: Sarah Mustillo

Personal details
- Born: 1963 (age 62–63) U.S.
- Spouse: Jean McManus
- Children: 4
- Education: University of Notre Dame (BA); Stanford University (PhD)

John Thomas McGreevy (born 1963) is an American historian who is the Charles and Jill Fischer provost of the University of Notre Dame. He previously served as dean of the Notre Dame College of Arts and Letters from 2008 to 2018. He earned his Bachelor of Arts degree in history from Notre Dame and his Doctor of Philosophy degree in history from Stanford University. He has been on the Notre Dame faculty since 1997. He is the author of Catholicism and American Freedom.

== Books ==
- Parish Boundaries: The Catholic Encounter with Race in the Twentieth Century Urban North, University of Chicago Press 1996.
- Catholicism and American Freedom: A History, W. W. Norton 2003.
- American Jesuits and the World: How an Embattled Religious Order Made Modern Catholicism Global, Princeton University Press, 2016.
- Catholicism: A Global History from the French Revolution to Pope Francis, W. W. Norton 2022.

=== Articles ===
- (September 28, 2023) How Catholicism Fostered and Inhibited Democratic Revolutions
