= Sarah Damaske =

American sociologist

Sarah Damaske is an American sociologist. She is the Roy C. Buck Professor of American Institutions and Sociology, Labor and Employment Relations, and Women's Studies at Pennsylvania State University, where she serves as associate director of the Population Research Institute. Her research addresses work, family, gender, unemployment and social inequality.

== Books ==
Damaske's first book, For the Family? How Class and Gender Shape Women's Work, was published by Oxford University Press in 2011. Drawing on interviews with 80 women, it argues that steady employment across the life course is a resource more readily available to middle-class women than to working-class women. It further says that women across classes describe their working lives in terms of family need. Leah Ruppanner reviewed the book for Contemporary Sociology, and Suzanne M. Bianchi reviewed it for Work and Occupations. It received the National Women's Studies Association Sara Whaley Prize in 2011 and the North Central Sociological Association's Scholarly Achievement Award for books in 2012.

With Kathleen Gerson, Damaske co-wrote The Science and Art of Interviewing (Oxford University Press, 2020), a guide to qualitative interview methods. Reviewing it for the LSE Review of Books, M. Kerem Coban wrote that the book takes the reader from framing a research question through to reporting findings. The book makes a case for interviewing as a research method in its own right.

The Tolls of Uncertainty: How Privilege and the Guilt Gap Shape Unemployment in America was published by Princeton University Press in 2021. Based on interviews with 100 recently unemployed people in Pennsylvania, it argues that unemployment produces new inequalities shaped by gender and class, including a gap in self-blame between unemployed women and men. Writing in Social Forces, Pilar Gonalons-Pons said the study gives an unusually full account of how the unemployed move through that experience, and contributes to understanding of economic inequality and gender. Luís L. M. Aguiar reviewed the book for the American Journal of Sociology. The book received the William J. Goode Book Award from the Family Section of the American Sociological Association in 2023.

== Recognition ==
Damaske was elected to the Sociological Research Association in 2025.
