= American Behavioral Scientist =

Peer-reviewed academic journal

- Discipline: Psychology
- Language: English
- Edited by: Laura Lawrie

Publication details
- Former names: Political Research, Organization and Design (PROD)
- History: 1957–present
- Publisher: SAGE Publications
- Frequency: Monthly
- Impact factor: 2.531 (2021)

Standard abbreviations
- ISO 4: Am. Behav. Sci.

Indexing
- ISSN: 0002-7642 (print); 1552-3381 (web)
- LCCN: 63024254
- OCLC no.: 1332710

Links
- Journal homepage

American Behavioral Scientist is a peer-reviewed academic journal that publishes papers in the fields of social and behavioral sciences. The managing editor is Laura Lawrie. It was established in 1957 by Alfred de Grazia and is currently published by SAGE Publications, who acquired the journal from de Grazia.

== Abstracting and indexing ==
The journal is abstracted and indexed in Scopus and the Social Sciences Citation Index. According to the Journal Citation Reports, its 2021 impact factor is 2.531, ranking it 41 out of 111 journals in the category "Social Sciences, Interdisciplinary" and 88 out of 130 journals in the category "Psychology, Clinical".
