= American Sociological Review =

Bimonthly peer-reviewed academic journal

- Discipline: Sociology
- Language: English
- Edited by: David Cort, Joya Misra, Laurel Smith-Doerr, Donald Tomaskovic-Devey

Publication details
- History: 1936–present
- Publisher: SAGE Publications on behalf of the American Sociological Association (United States)
- Frequency: Bi-monthly
- Impact factor: 9.1 (2022)

Standard abbreviations
- ISO 4: Am. Sociol. Rev.

Indexing
- ISSN: 0003-1224 (print); 1939-8271 (web)
- LCCN: 37010449
- JSTOR: 00031224
- OCLC no.: 38161061

Links
- Journal homepage; Online access

The American Sociological Review (abbreviated ASR) is a bimonthly peer-reviewed academic journal that publishes original research and book reviews in the field of sociology and related social sciences. It is published by SAGE Publications on behalf of the American Sociological Association. It was established in 1936. Along with the American Journal of Sociology, it is considered one of the top journals in the academic field of sociology. The editors-in-chief are David Cort (University of Massachusetts Amherst), Joya Misra (University of Massachusetts Amherst), Laurel Smith-Doerr (University of Massachusetts Amherst), and Donald Tomaskovic-Devey (University of Massachusetts Amherst).

== History ==
=== Founding ===
For its first thirty years, the American Sociological Society (now the American Sociological Association) was largely dominated by the Department of Sociology at the University of Chicago, and the quasi-official journal of the association was the American Journal of Sociology. The creation of the American Sociological Review has been seen as a rebellion against the dominance of the Chicago school of sociology.

In 1935, the executive committee of the American Sociological Society voted 5 to 4 against disestablishing the American Journal of Sociology as the official journal of society, but the measure was passed on for consideration of the general membership, which voted 2 to 1 to establish a new journal independent of the University of Chicago: the American Sociological Review.

=== Early history ===
Over the period 1948–1968, more than 60% editors of the American Sociological Review earned their doctorate at the University of Chicago, Harvard University, or Columbia University. Over the period 1955–1965, four out of ten articles in the ASR were by individuals with doctorates from Chicago, Columbia, Harvard or the University of Michigan.

== Abstracting and indexing ==
The journal is abstracted and indexed in:

- Academic Search Premier
- Current Contents/Social & Behavioral Sciences
- Current Index to Statistics
- FRANCIS
- International Bibliography of the Social Sciences
- ProQuest databases
- PsycINFO
- Scopus
- Social Sciences Citation Index
- Sociological Abstracts

According to the Journal Citation Reports, its 2019 impact factor is 9.1, ranking it 3rd out of 149 journals in the category "Sociology".

== Past editors ==
The following persons have been editors-in-chief:

- F.H. Hankin (Smith College (1936–1937)
- Read Bain (Miami University (1938–1942)
- Joseph K. Folsom (Vassar College (1943–1944)
- F. Stuart Chapin and George B. Vold (University of Minnesota (1945–1946)
- Robert C. Angell (University of Michigan (1947–1948)
- Maurice R. Davie (Yale University (1949–1951)
- Robert E.L. Faris (University of Washington (1952–1955)
- Leonard Broom (University of California, Los Angeles (1956–1957)
- Charles Page (Smith College (1958–1960)
- Harry Alpert (University of Oregon (1961–1962)
- Neil J. Smelser (University of California, Berkeley (1963–1965)
- Norman Ryder (University of Wisconsin (1966–1968)
- Karl F. Schuessler (Indiana University (1969–1971)
- James F. Short Jr. (Washington State University (1972–1974)
- Morris Zelditch (Stanford University (1975–1977)
- Rita J. Simon (University of Illinois, Urbana (1978–1980)
- William Form (University of Illinois, Urbana (1981)
- Sheldon Stryker (Indiana University (1982–1986)
- William Form (Ohio State University (1987–1989)
- Gerald Marwell (University of Wisconsin (1990–1993)
- Paula England (University of Arizona (1994–1996)
- Glenn Firebaugh (Pennsylvania State University (1997–2000)
- Charles Camic and Franklin Wilson (University of Wisconsin (2000–2003)
- Jerry Jacobs (University of Pennsylvania (2003–2006)
- Randy Hodson and Vincent Roscigno (Ohio State University (2006–2009)
- Tony Brown, Katharine M. Donato, Larry W. Isaac, and Holly J. McCammon, Vanderbilt University (2010-2012)
- Larry W. Isaac and Holly J. McCammon, Vanderbilt University (2013-2015)
- Omar Lizardo, Rory M. McVeigh, and Sarah Mustillo, University of Notre Dame (2016-2020)
- Arthur S. Alderson and Dina G. Okamoto, Indiana University (2021–2023)
