= Southern Sociological Society =

American organization

- Formation: April 20, 1935; 89 years ago
- Website: www.southernsociologicalsociety.org

The Southern Sociological Society (SSS) was established in 1935 by a group of colleagues in Knoxville, Tennessee in an organizational meeting April 20–21. This meeting emerged from an earlier gathering of Southern sociologists at the American Sociological Society (now the American Sociological Association) in 1934 between Charles S. Johnson, E. T. Krueger, Wilson Gee, and probably Rupert Vance (who worked for Johnson). The organization of the Knoxville meeting was chaired by E.T. Krueger, the program made by William E. Cole, and the constitution drafted by Rupert Vance with assistance from Wilson Gee.

Suggested as early as 1932 by one Wilson Gee and others. A year earlier, in 1934. Simpson credits Gee as the father for Gee “kept alive the idea for at least three years, and the mission of the Society expressed at Knoxville reflects his deep commitment to research on problems of the South”. During a time of Jim Crow segregation, the early founders of the Southern Sociological Society demanded a policy that all of its meetings be held in integrated hotels. The Southern Sociological Society is a society of academic professionals that promotes the development of sociology as a profession and scientific discipline by the maintenance of high academic professional and ethical standards, and by encouraging effective teaching of sociology, valid and reliable methods and research in the study of human society, diffusion of sociological knowledge and its application to societal problems, cooperation with related disciplines and groups, recruitment and training of sociologists, and development of sociology programs in educational and other agencies.

== Social Currents ==
Social Currents
- Discipline: Sociology
- Language: English

Publication details
- Publisher: SAGE Publications

Standard abbreviations
- ISO 4: Soc. Curr.

Indexing
- ISSN: 2329-4965 (print); 2329-4973 (web)
- OCLC no.: 847520088

Links
- Journal homepage

With SAGE Publications, the Southern Sociological Society publishes Social Currents, "the official journal of the Southern Sociological Society, is a broad-ranging social science journal that focuses on research from all methodological and theoretical orientations with implications for national and international sociological communities".
