= University of North Carolina Press =

Nonprofit university press publisher

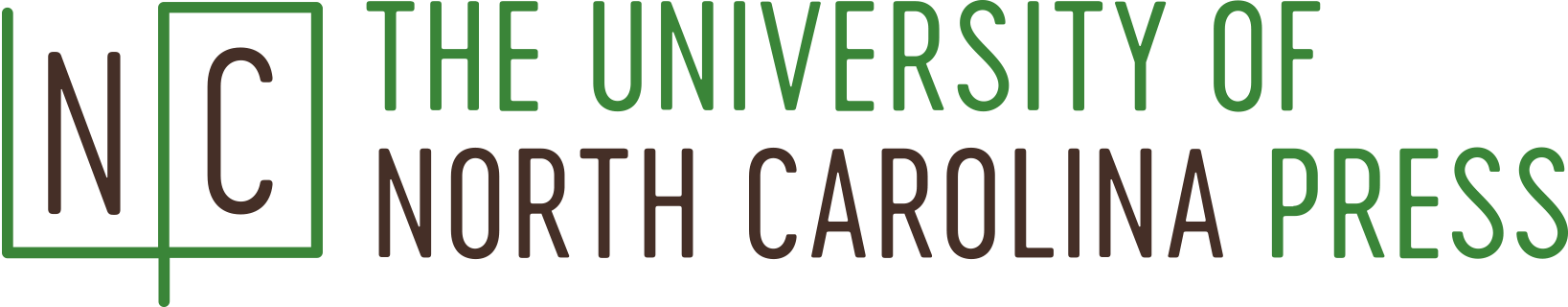
- Founded: 1922; 104 years ago
- Country of origin: United States
- Headquarters location: Chapel Hill, North Carolina
- Publication types: Books, Academic journals
- Imprints: Ferris and Ferris Books
- Official website: uncpress.org

The University of North Carolina Press (UNC Press), founded in 1922, is a nonprofit university press associated with the University of North Carolina. It was the first university press founded in the Southern United States. UNC Press is a member of the Association of University Presses, with its office located in Chapel Hill.

== History ==
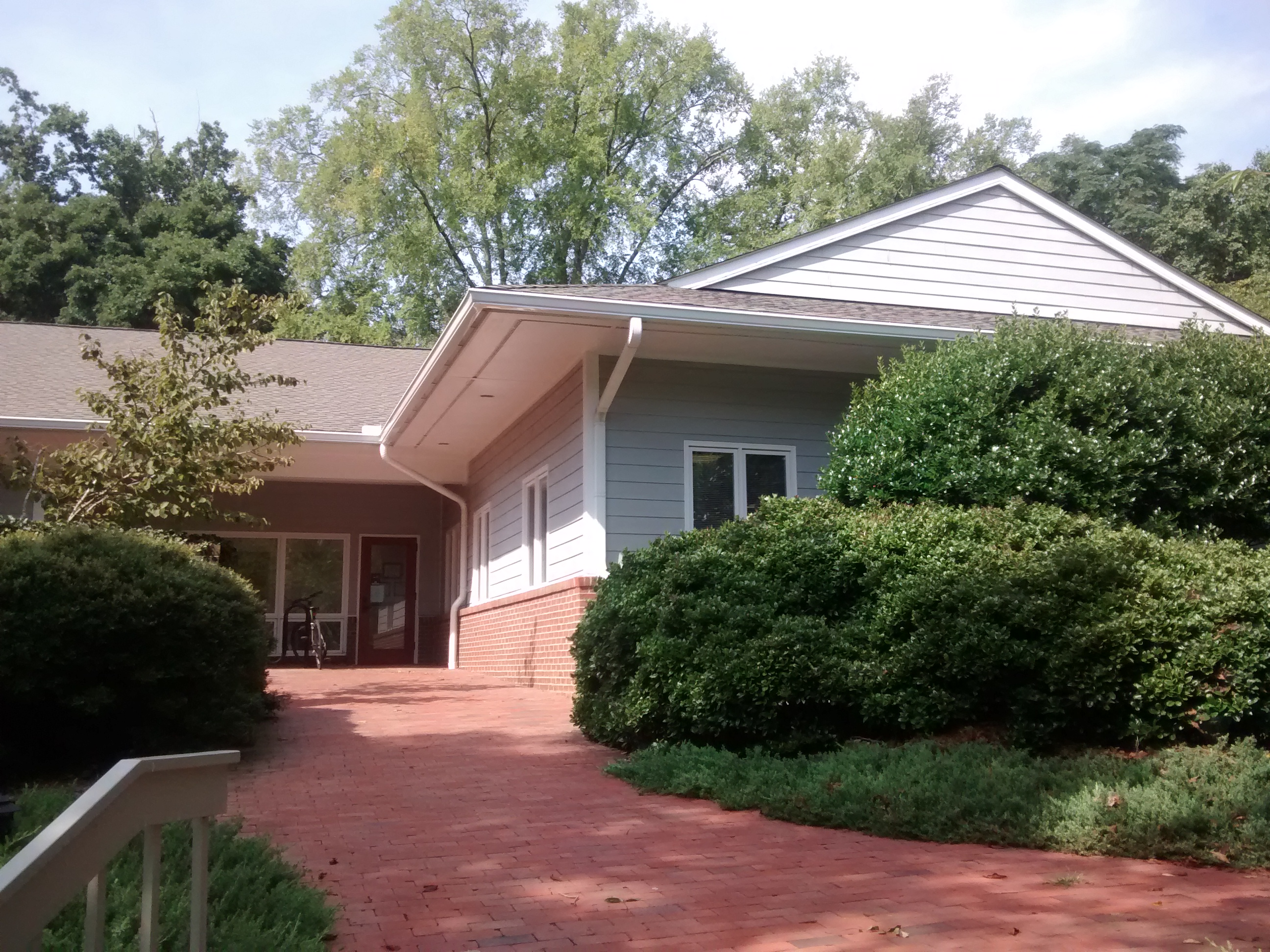
UNC Press building in 2014.

UNC Press began its publishing history in 1925 with Southern Pioneers in Social Interpretation, edited by sociologist Howard W. Odum, one of the press's founders. The volume featured essays on both Black and white Southern figures, including Booker T. Washington and Woodrow Wilson, and aimed to present the South as a region with cultural and intellectual contributions. The collection received national attention and was described by The New Republic as signaling a "quickening breeze from the South." This publication helped establish UNC Press's long-term mission to highlight diverse voices and subjects related to the Southern experience.

In 2006, UNC Press started the distribution company Longleaf Services as an affiliate.

== See also ==
- List of English-language book publishing companies
- List of university presses

== Bibliography ==
- Suchma, Sharon Margaret (2013). Binding Lives: Southern Photobooks and the Great Depression in America (Doctor of Philosophy thesis). City University of New York. ProQuest 1468443342.
- Kalleberg, Arne L; Newell, Abigail (2022). "100 Years of Social Forces" (PDF). Social Forces. 101 (1). Oxford University Press: 4–37. doi:10.1093/sf/soac050. ISSN 0037-7732. OCLC 9569687352. S2CID 252520840. Project MUSE 864969. Archived from the original (PDF) on June 21, 2025.
- Arnold, Taylor; Rivard, Courtney; Tilton, Lauren (2022). Layered Lives: Rhetoric and Representation in the Southern Life History Project. Stanford, California: Stanford University Press. doi:10.21627/2022ll. ISBN 978-1-5036-1528-1. OCLC 1337868509. S2CID 247966950. Archived from the original on June 21, 2025.
