= Jennifer Lee (sociologist) =

American sociologist

- Born: January 9, 1968 (age 58)
- Occupation: Julian Clarence Levi Professor of Social Sciences

Academic background
- Education: Columbia University

Academic work
- Discipline: Sociology
- Institutions: University of California, Irvine; Columbia University

Jennifer Lee (born January 9, 1968) is an American sociologist and the Julian Clarence Levi Professor of Social Sciences at Columbia University. She was president of the Eastern Sociological Society from 2020 to 2021. Previously, Lee was on the faculty of the University of California, Irvine.

Lee is the author, co-author, or co-editor of four books: Civility in the City: Blacks, Jews, and Koreans in Urban America; Asian American Youth: Culture, Identity, and Ethnicity (co-edited with Min Zhou); The Diversity Paradox: Immigration and the Color Line in 21st Century America (co-authored with Frank D. Bean); and The Asian American Achievement Paradox (co-authored with Min Zhou).

Lee was born in South Korea and her family emigrated to the United States in 1971. She attended Springside Chestnut Hill Academy in Philadelphia, Pennsylvania, where she graduated in 1986. Lee was educated at Columbia University, earning a BA in 1990, MA in 1995, and PhD in 1998, all in sociology.

In 2022, she was named a fellow of the American Academy of Arts and Sciences.

== Books ==
- Civility in the City: Blacks, Jews, and Koreans in Urban America Published in 2002
- Asian American Youth: Culture, Identity, and Ethnicity Published in 2004
- The Diversity Paradox: Immigration and the Color Line in Twenty-First Century America Published in 2010
- The Asian American Achievement Paradox Published in 2015
