= Anneliese Maier =

German historian of science (1905–1971)

Anneliese Maier (German: [ˈmaɪɐ]; November 17, 1905 in Tübingen, Germany – December, 1971 in Rome, Italy) was a German historian of science particularly known for her work researching natural philosophy in the middle ages.

== Biography ==
Anneliese Maier was the daughter of the philosopher Heinrich Maier (1876–1933). She studied natural sciences and philosophy from 1923 to 1926 at the universities in Berlin and Zurich. In 1930 she finished her dissertation on Immanuel Kant (Kants Qualitätskategorien). She then worked for the Prussian Academy of Sciences. In 1936 she moved to Rome. There she worked until 1945 at the Biblioteca Apostolica Vaticana on the philosophy of nature.

According to E. J. Dijksterhuis, the path of the influence of Oresme through James of St. Martinus was found by Maier: "The fourteenth-century treatise De Latitudinibus formarum which, omitting all the speculative elements, gives a summary of the purely mathematical part of Oresme's own work, was very widely diffused, first in manuscript and later in print, and as Auctor de latitudinibus the anonymous author became better known than Oresme himself. Through later researches by Miss A. Maier, the identity of this Auctor has meanwhile been established: the man who ensured the survival of Oresme's methods was an Italian Augustinian hermit, James of St. Martinus, also called James of Naples."

In 1951 Maier became a professor at the University of Cologne. She became a member of the Academies of Sciences in Mainz (1949), Göttingen (1962) and Munich (1966). In 1966 she received the George Sarton Medal for her profound studies on the history of natural philosophy in the Middle Ages.

The Alexander von Humboldt Foundation has named a research grant after her, the Anneliese Maier Research Award, which is a "collaboration award to promote the internationalisation of the humanities and social sciences in Germany."

== Selected works ==
- 1982: On the Threshold of Exact Science: Selected Writings of Anneliese Maier on Late Medieval Natural Philosophy, Steven D. Sargent, editor and translator, University of Pennsylvania Press.
- 1930: Kants Qualitätskategorien
- 1938: Die Mechanisierung des Weltbildes im 17. Jahrhundert
- Studien zur Naturphilosophie der Spätscholastik, 5 parts, 1949–1958.
  - 1949: Die Vorläufer Galileis im 14. Jahrhundert
  - 1951: Zwei Grundprobleme der scholastischen Naturphilosophie
  - 1952: An der Grenze von Scholastik und Naturwissenschaft
  - 1955: Metaphysische Hintergründe der spätscholastischen Naturphilosophie
  - 1958: Zwischen Philosophie und Mechanik. Studien zur Naturphilosophie der Spätscholastik
- 1964–1977: Ausgehendes Mittelalter: Gesammelte Aufsätze zur Geistesgeschichte des 14. Jahrhunderts, 3 volumes.
