= Notre Dame College of Arts and Letters =

Constituent college of University of Notre Dame

Coordinates: 41°42′01.1″N 86°14′08.7″W

College of Arts and Letters
- College of Arts and Letters at the University of Notre Dame
- Motto: Study everything. Do anything.
- Type: Private
- Established: 1842; 184 years ago
- Parent institution: University of Notre Dame
- Undergraduates: 1,914
- Postgraduates: 1,128
- Location: Notre Dame, Indiana, United States
- Website: al.nd.edu

The College of Arts & Letters is the oldest and largest college within the University of Notre Dame. The Dean of the College of Arts & Letters is Kenneth Scheve.

== History ==
The College of Arts & Letters is the oldest in the university, and it was founded in 1842 with the university itself. The college has a rich history dating back to the founding of the University of Notre Dame in 1842. At that time, the curriculum was focused on classical studies and philosophy, but as the university grew and expanded, so did the College of Arts & Letters. In 1919, the College of Arts & Letters was officially established, and over the years, it has become known for its strong programs in the humanities, social sciences, and arts. Today, the college offers over 60 different programs, including in areas such as anthropology, economics, philosophy, and studio art.

== Facilities ==
The main center of the college is O'Shaughnessy Hall, which hosts classrooms, art galleries, a coffee shop, and administrative offices. It was built in 1953 by Ellerbe Associates in Tudor Gothic style. Ground was broken for it in July 1951 and the cornerstone was laid in May. The building is known for its iconic clock and entrance hall with stained glass windows. In addition to classrooms, the building also featured music rooms and 4 art galleries, which were later incorporated into the Snite Museum of Art. The Snite exhibits were recently moved to the Raclin Family Museum of Art. The Snite is now a private space, not open to the public. The high-beam decorated ceiling was painted by Alphonse Schmitt. The building was the gift of philanthropist Ignatius Aloysius O'Shaughnessy and cost $2,300,000. O'Shaughnessy was an oil tycoon and philanthropist; he was made Knight Commander Order of St. Gregory on June 17, 1958, by Pius XII, Pope Paul VI made him papal count in 1967, and the National Conference of Christians and Jews bestowed upon him its Brotherhood Award in 1971. Its Great Hall, which is decorated and sculpted on the outside, features a crucifix by Croatian sculptor Ivan Meštrović, a bust of Dean Charles E. Sheedy, and 7 stained glass windows, representing the seven liberal arts. The Great Hall also hosts two tapestries that were rediscovered and restored in 2014 when the Hall was restored to its original appearance. One tapestry is of German or Belgian production from the 17th century, while the other one is from 18th century France. It was featured in the movie Rudy. Offices for most of the faculty of the college are housed in Decio and Malloy Halls, which are situated just east of O'Shaughnessy Hall.

Corbett Family Hall, which is part of the Campus Crossroads expansion of the Notre Dame Stadium, houses the Departments of Anthropology and Psychology. On the first floor, Corbett houses the Notre Dame Studios department, focusing on all on campus television events along with sports television production. Corbett is a 280,000-square-foot building, and is located on the East side of the stadium, between the Dan Devine (Gate A) and Ara Parseghian (Gate B) gates, facing the Edmund P. Joyce Center. The second floor houses the Department of Anthropology, with research laboratories, offices, study and meeting rooms, classrooms, and social events spaces . The third, fourth, and fifth floors house the Department of Psychology's offices, more than 30 research labs, and classrooms. The third floor is mostly cognitive psychology, the fourth floor is mainly behavioral psychology, and the fifth floor is mainly a mixture of relationship psychology and others. The anthropology and psychology departments, both in the College of Arts & Letters, were scattered around campus and without a single location before the opening of Corbett.

The departments of Art and Art History, and Design is housed in the Leo and Edna Riley Hall of Art & Design. The building, which built in 1917 as a chemistry hall, was renovated in 1982 thanks to a donation from Allan Riley, real estate investor and 1957 graduate. The department also houses its graphic and industrial design programs in the recently renovated West Lake hall. The Department of Film, Television, and Theatre is housed and has its performance and recital spaces in the DeBartolo Performing Arts Center, in addition to using several other facilities such as Washington Hall and the Martin Media Center in Corbett Hall and others. The Departments of Philosophy and Theology are housed in Malloy Hall.

The Department of Political Science is in Jenkins Nanovic Hall. These two four-story buildings occupy 185,500 square feet. They were ready for use in 2017. This building is also home to the Department of Economics as well as the Department of Sociology. Nanovic Hall is connected to the new Jenkins Hall, named for Notre Dame's former president, Rev. John I. Jenkins, C.S.C., which contains the Keough School for Global Affairs and several institutes, including the Liu Institute, the Notre Dame International Security Center, and the Center for Citizenship and Constitutional Government.

The Music department is housed in O'Neill Hall, also part of the Campus Crossroads project and on the Notre Dame Stadium. The fifth and sixths floors of O'Neill Hall are dedicated to the Sacred Music Program and house departmental offices, teaching studios and practice rooms. The third floor hosts the Michuda Family Visiting Artist Rehearsal Hall as well as seminar rooms, two mid-sized classrooms, and large lecture hall, and the music library, which was relocated from the Hesburgh Library. The first floor also hosts LaBar Family Performance and Rehearsal Hall, both 2,200-square-feet. The recital hall has 175 seats, offering a more intimate atmosphere than other spaces on campus. It features a traditional stage, fixed seating, and a formal atmosphere for classical concert music. The Performance Hall instead is more an interdisciplinary performance space, accommodating alternative types of musical events in combination with other media, such as projected text visual images, acting, lighting, and dance. It has flexible seating and staging options in a "black-box" style setting that can host avant-garde performance and experimentation.

== Departments ==
The Humanities

- Africana Studies
- American Studies (includes journalism)
- Classics (includes Arabic Studies)
- East Asian Languages and Cultures
- English
- Department of German, Slavic, and Eurasian Studies
- History
- Irish Language and Literature
- Philosophy
- Program of Liberal Studies
- Romance Languages and Literatures
- Theology

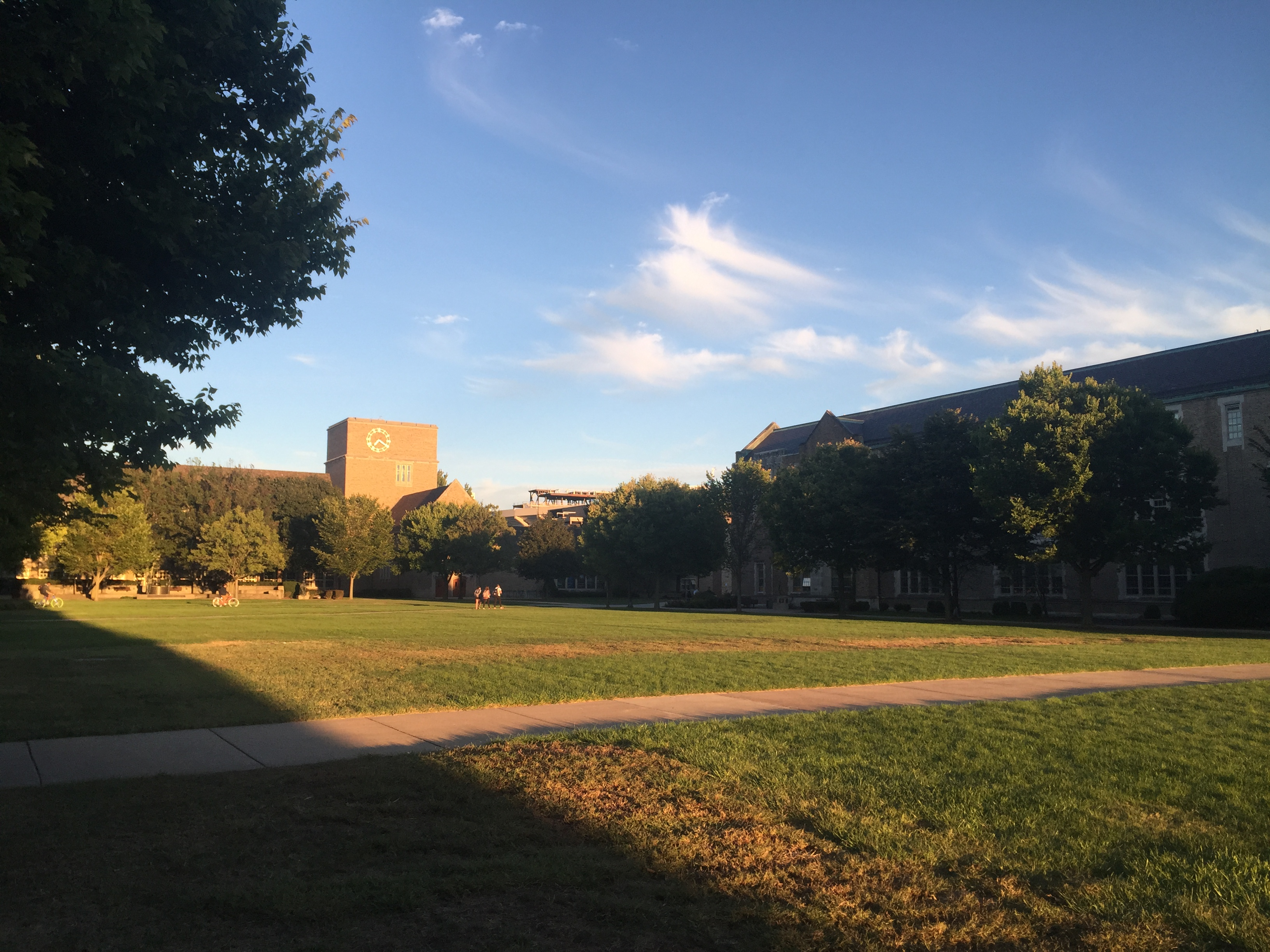
O'Shaughnessy Hall, the home of the College of Arts & Letters

The Arts

- Art, Art History & Design
- Film, Television, and Theatre
- Music

The Social Sciences

- Anthropology
- Economics
- Political Science
- Psychology
- Sociology

== Centers, Institutes, and Affiliations ==
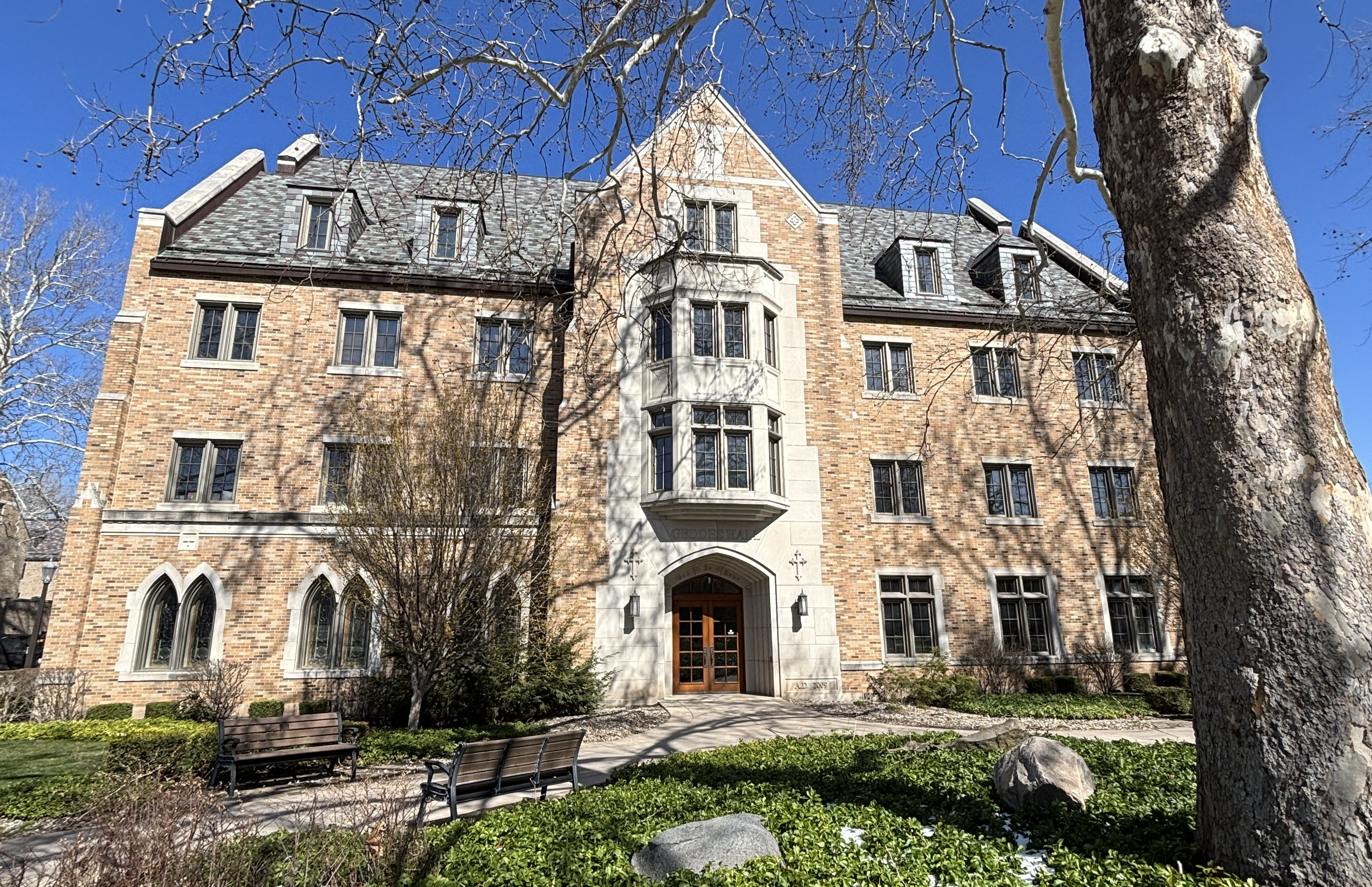
Geddes Hall at the University of Notre Dame

=== The Center for Social Concerns ===
The College of Arts & letters is also affiliated with the Notre Dame Center for Social Concerns, located in Geddes Hall, which studies poverty, injustice, and oppression. "Justice education," "Research for the Common Good," and "Consequential Conservations," are the three avenues that the center for social concerns explores. Established at Notre Dame in 1983, the center hosts a range of signature events and has a range of curricular and co-curricular programs for undergraduates, graduate, and professional students. It also works with academics, advocates, and artists to examine and address many concerning social problems worldwide. Catholic social tradition (CST) provides the framework for which the center operates.

=== Medieval Institute ===
Notre Dame's Medieval Institute, with over fifty faculty fellows from thirteen different departments, is one of the oldest, largest, and most prestigious centers in the United States for the study of the Middle Ages. Though based on an earlier program dating back to 1933, the Medieval Institute was formally founded in 1946 through the efforts of Father Philip S. Moore, C.S.C., then Dean of the Graduate School. Located on the seventh floor of the Hesburgh Library, the Institute hosts a large graduate program, as well as a number of undergraduates minoring and majoring in medieval studies.

The Medieval Institute Library today houses around 30,000 books across six reference collections in five designated reading rooms. It also holds over 60,000 circulating volumes in the Medieval Institute General Collection and over 12,000 reels of microfilm from the Biblioteca Ambrosiana in Milan. The concept for the Ambrosiana collection was conceived in 1960 when the Archbishop of Milan, Cardinal Giovanni Battista Montini (the future Pope Paul VI), visited Notre Dame to receive an honorary degree. It today consists of microfilm images of the Ambrosiana's Latin, Greek, Arabic, Hebrew, European vernacular, and semitic language manuscript holdings, as well as photographic and bibliographic materials related to the Ambrosiana's extensive Renaissance drawing collection. The Library also includes a Paleography Collection, the Astrik L. Gabriel History of Universities Collection, a Byzantine and Classics Reference Collection, and a Near Eastern Reference Collection.

=== Eck Institute for Global Health ===
A university-wide enterprise, the Eck Institute for Global Health (EIGH) promotes research, training, and service to advance health standards and reduce health disparities. The EIGH includes epidemiology, Molecular biology and microbiology, Computational science, Maternal, child, and community health, Genetics and genomics, Biochemistry, Non-communicable diseases, Social sciences.

=== Institute for Educational Initiatives ===
The Notre Dame Institute for Educational Initiatives was founded in 1996 under the direction of Prof. Maureen Hallinan.

=== Institute for Latino Studies ===
Created in 1999, the Institute for Latino Studies focuses on understanding of the U.S. Latino experience. Building upon the history of Latinos at Notre Dame and the legacy of Julian Samora, a pioneering Latino scholar and professor of sociology, the institute supports scholarly initiatives in Latino studies.

=== Lucy Family Institute for Data & Society ===
The Lucy Family Institute serves as a point of collaboration between the humanities and data science, AI, and machine learning. By combining these together, they seek to create a policy about human development, poverty, and global development that is effective and informed by data. The institute was founded in December 2019 with a $25 million gift from alumnus Robert Lumpkins and his wife, Sara. Leading the institute as the Founding Director is Nitesh Chawla. As a part of its establishment, the Lucy Family Institute integrated two pre-existing research centers at the university that operated with a primary focus on data science, societal interface, and interdisciplinary applications of data science: the Center for Network and Data Science (CNDS) and the Center for Social Science Research (CSSR).

=== Research Centers and Affiliations ===
In addition to its affiliations with Interdisciplinary institutes, faculty, graduate, and undergraduate students in the College of Arts & Letters also conduct research projects with a variety of research centers. These include the De Nicola Center for Ethics and Culture, the Center for Italian Studies, the Center for Research on Educational Opportunity, the Center for the Study of Social Movements, the John J. Reilly Center for Science, Technology, and Values, the Rooney Center for the Study of American Democracy, the William J. Shaw Center for Children and Families, and the Wilson Sheehan Lab for Economic Opportunities.

The College of Arts & Letters is also affiliated with a number of research centers within the university that are dedicated to the furtherance and study of the Catholic categories fundamental to the core values of the University of Notre Dame. Such centers include the Center for Philosophy of Religion, the Center for the Study of Religion and Society, the Center for Theology, Science, and Human Flourishing, and the Cushwa Center for the Study of American Catholicism.

== Deans ==
- 1919–1923: Joseph Leonard Carrico
- 1923–1935: Charles C. Miltner
- 1935–1936: T. Bowyer Campbell
- 1936–1940: Charles C. Miltner
- 1940–1943: Francis J. Boland
- 1943–1951: Francis P. Cavanaugh
- 1951–1969: Charles E. Sheedy
- 1969–1975: Frederick J. Crosson
- 1975–1981: Isabel Charles
- 1981–1983: Robert E. Burns
- 1983–1991: Michael J. Loux
- 1991–1997: Harold W. Attridge
- 1997–2008: Mark W. Roche
- 2008–2018: John McGreevy
- 2018–2025: Sarah Mustillo
- 2025–present: Kenneth Scheve
