= Alison Brysk =

American political scientist

Alison Brysk (born March 8, 1960) is an American political scientist who holds the Mellichamp Chair in Global Governance, Global and International Studies, at the University of California, Santa Barbara, specializing in international Human Rights.

Brysk attended Pomona College received a master's degree in political science and a Ph.D. in political science, both from Stanford University. Her doctoral thesis was "The political impact of Argentina's human rights movement: social movements, transition and democratization." Brysk has taught at University of New Mexico, Pomona, Stanford, Lund University in Sweden, and the University of California, Irvine. She currently teaches at the University of California, Santa Barbara in the Global and International Studies department.

In 2011, Brysk was the Fulbright Senior Scholar at Ravenshaw University in India, and in 2007 she held the Fulbright Distinguished Visiting Chair in Global Governance at Canada's CIGI. Brysk was a fellow at the Woodrow Wilson International Center for Scholars in Washington, D.C. for the 2013-2014 academic year, where she completed a project called "Women's Rights as Human Rights: Constructing Political Will." Brysk has served as an officer of both the American Political Science Association and the International Studies Association. She is a member of the Council on Foreign Relations. She has been published in a range of academic journals, including Comparative Political Studies, Human Rights Quarterly, and Polity.

== Selected publications ==
- 1994. The Politics of Human Rights in Argentina: Protest, Change, and Democratization. Stanford University Press. ISBN 978-0-8047-2275-9.
- 2000. From Tribal Village to Global Village: Indian Rights and International Relations in Latin America. Stanford University Press. ISBN 978-0-8047-3458-5.
- 2004. Human Rights and Private Wrongs: Constructing Global Civil Society. Routledge. ISBN 978-0-415-94476-2.
- 2007. National Insecurity and Human Rights: Democracies Debate Counterterrorism. University of California Press. (Co-edited with Gershon Shafir). ISBN 978-0-520-09860-2.
- 2009. Global Good Samaritans: Human Rights as Foreign Policy. Oxford University Press. ISBN 978-0-19-538157-3.
- 2013. Speaking Rights to Power: Constructing Political Will. Oxford University Press. ISBN 978-0-19-998266-0.
- 2018. The Future of Human Rights. Polity. ISBN 978-1-5095-2057-2.
- 2018. The Struggle for Freedom from Fear: Contesting Violence against Women at the Frontiers of Globalization. ISBN 978-0-19-090154-7.
- 2025. Abortion Rights Backlash: The Struggle for Democracy in Europe and the Americas. Oxford University Press. ISBN 978-0-19-780045-4.
