= Sociological Forum =

- Discipline: Sociology
- Language: English
- Edited by: Tammy Anderson, Asia Friedman, Ann Bell

Publication details
- History: 1986-present
- Publisher: Wiley on behalf of the Eastern Sociological Society
- Frequency: Quarterly
- Impact factor: 1.8 (2023)

Standard abbreviations
- ISO 4: Sociol. Forum

Indexing
- ISSN: 0884-8971 (print); 1573-7861 (web)

Links
- Journal homepage; Online access; Online archive

Sociological Forum is a quarterly peer-reviewed academic journal published by Wiley on behalf of the Eastern Sociological Society. The journal was established in 1986 with Robin M. Williams Jr as founding editor-in-chief. Subsequent editors were Steven Cole, Richard Hall, Robert Max Jackson and Karen A. Cerulo. The current editors-in-chief are Tammy Anderson, Asia Friedman, and Ann Bell (University of Delaware).

According to the Journal Citation Reports, the journal has a 2023 impact factor of 1.8.
