= Education of immigrants in the United States =

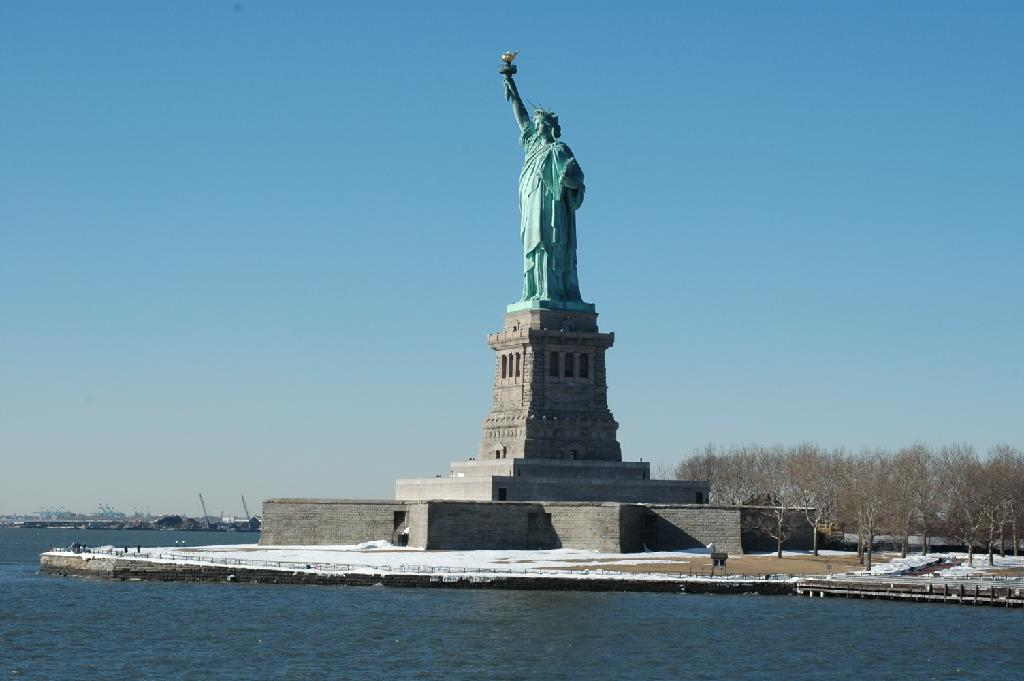
Statue of Liberty in New York City

Immigrants make up about 13% of the US population, about 42 million out of a total population of 318.9 million citizens in 2017. First and second generation immigrant children have become the fastest-growing segment of the United States population. Compared to the native-born population, young adults aged 15–34 are significantly over-represented in new immigrants. Children and immigrants ages 35–44 are in similar proportion to native-born Americans, but older people are under-represented in new immigrants.

Towards the end of the 19th century, immigration was growing tremendously within the United States. Despite this in 1891, the NEA (National Education Association) supported that children should only be instructed in English, despite some school's allowing core classes in foreign languages. When the Compulsory Education Act was passed in 1895, children between the ages of eight and sixteen years were mandated to attend school. With rising immigration populations, by 1906, 17% of the public school enrollment was reported as being foreign-born by the Third Biennial School Census. And by 1911 it is reported that 57.5% of children in public schools had foreign-born parentage.

The Supreme Court of the United States ruled in 1982 in Plyler v. Doe that states cannot deny students an education on account of their immigration status, allowing students to gain access to the United States' public schooling system. This case is known as being one of the first cases to establish legal "rights" for immigrant education in America. Further, the 1974 Supreme Court case Lau v. Nichols prohibited discrimination based on race or national origin and determined that school systems in the United States must provide English language instruction. By 1996, a federal piece of legislature called the Illegal Reforms and Immigration Responsibilities Act (IRIRA) was put in place to prevent the states from giving undocumented students access to benefits regarding postsecondary education. As a result, multiple states passed laws or acts in order to base tuition off of attendance, merit or need instead of residency or nationality. Examples of this occurrence are shown in legislation like the California Assembly Bill (AB) 540, or the California DREAM Act (2001). The California DREAM Act stemmed from a separate but similarly proposed legislation– the DREAM Act– and allowed students enrolled in California universities and educational programs to apply for state financial aid.

The DREAM ( (Development, Relief, and Education for Alien Minors) Act was a proposed act that would have conditionally given undocumented students permanent residency and financial aid– differing from DACA – which is a renewal process that risks the undocumented individual's deportation if not fulfilled every two years. Though never passed, its supporters and immigrant students coined the term "Dreamers" to describe the potential in education despite the challenges immigration might face. The "Dream" movement began gaining momentum in 2010 and the term was coined when referring to undocumented youth in reference to the DREAM Act. The Every Student Succeeds Act (ESSA) signed by President Obama in 2015 mandates English proficiency standards that hold state programs accountable for the performance of English-language (EL) programs. The most common forms of EL instruction are English as a Second Language (ESL) programs for students identified as low-English proficiency (LEP) learners.

== Overview ==
By 2000, 23% of scientists with a PhD in the U.S. were immigrants, including 40% of those in engineering and computers. Roughly a third of the United States' college and university graduate students in STEM fields are foreign nationals—in some states, it is well over half of their graduate students.

In 2016, current school enrollment figures show that immigrants lag behind native-born populations in attending pre-school and K–12 education, but they proportionally outpace native-born populations in attending colleges or universities.

Source
| | Total | Native-Born | Foreign-Born |
|---|---|---|---|
| Preschool | 6.0% | 6.4% | 1.5% |
| K-8 | 44.9% | 46.5% | 23.0% |
| 9-12 | 20.6% | 20.6% | 21.1% |
| Higher Education | 28.4% | 26.5% | 54.3% |

While the trend is changing with changes in demographics, immigrants tend to be less educated than their native-born counterparts. They are significantly more likely to have less than a high school education, yet they are also slightly more likely to hold an advanced degree. Given the high education enrollment rates of immigrant populations, though, this is very likely to change in the next decade. By creating special visa programs, the Immigration Act of 1990 has increased the percentage of immigrants with a college education to about 29%. However, this number is only slightly more than 10% of the overall population. Further, the US Department of Education estimates that "over 4.7 million foreign-born individuals enrolled in pre-kindergarten to postsecondary education, representing 6% of the total student population. Another 20 million students are the children of foreign-born parents."

Most governments know that educators require training specific to the needs of refugee and immigrant students, but trainings are typically one-off, and poor in quality while much of the scholarly research has emphasized what has not worked, rather than highlighting proven strategies. According to McBrien the first priority is to create a safe space for the students, in which they can see themselves, are connected to their cultural heritage and able to accustom themselves to the culture of the host country. The second priority is language.

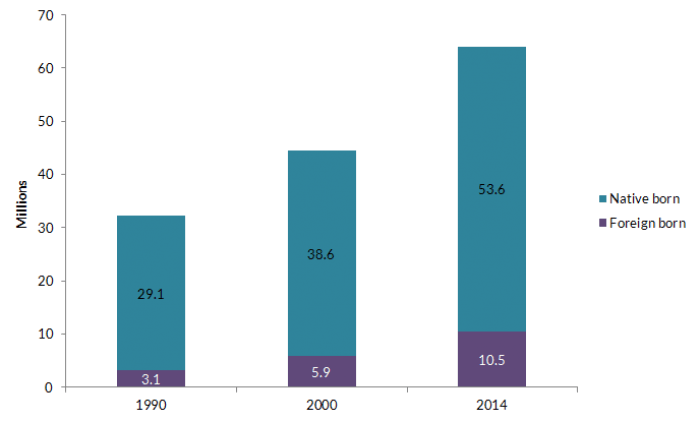
Number of college-educated people in the United States by Immigration Status

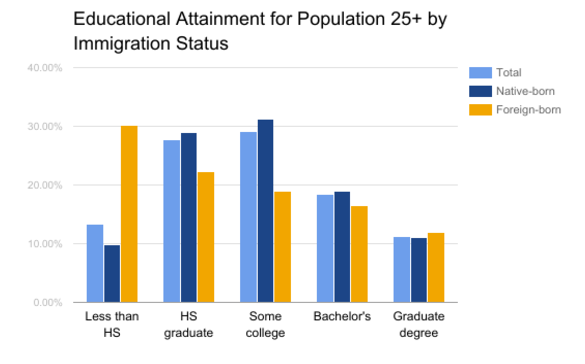
Educational attainment for population 25+ by immigration status

== Education in the United States ==
=== Historical context ===
The United States has a long history of discriminating against immigrants and refugees, beginning in 1790 with the Naturalization Act. This law offered citizenship only to "free white person[s]" and excluded it from all others, although various laws banned suspected anarchists, prostitutes, polygamists, or convicted of crimes “of moral turpitude,” and those likely to become a “public charge,” and most new Chinese immigrants, and requiring that all immigrants over age 16 prove they could read and write. Still, the vast majority of Europeans who reached the United States were granted entry; the U.S. Immigration Service excluded only 1 percent of the 25 million Europeans who arrived between 1880 and World War I. After that, laws reliably favored immigrants from northern and western Europe, restricting or preventing entirely immigration from southern and eastern Europe as well as Asia and Africa. The situation changed slightly in 1943 when it was decided that a respectively small number of Chinese immigrants be allowed in. The fight to keep non-European immigration low continued, despite race being taken down as a deciding factor in immigration cases in 1952.

But the system had already begun falling apart. A major shift came in 1953 with the Refugee Relief Act, allowing over 200,000 refugees to become citizens. The Immigration and Nationality Act of 1965 placed a ceiling on immigration from countries in the Western Hemisphere, followed by several laws which opened doors for refugees from Vietnam, Nicaragua, China and Haiti. More laws followed, and consequently, legal immigration from the Latin American region grew to make up 44 percent of immigration to the United States by the 1990s, compared with 29 percent for Asia, 14 percent for Europe, 6 percent for Africa, and 7 percent for the rest of the world.

While laws have since been enacted to grant refugees and immigrants protected status, including President Obama's 2012 implementation of Deferred Action for Childhood Arrivals (DACA), the history out of which the current political climate has been carved is such that xenophobic reactions and harassment continue to be experienced by refugees and immigrants to the US. DACA was put in place to protect those who were undocumented and came to America as children, offering protection from deportation through education or a work permit that lasts about 2 years.

New wave of immigrants often generate nativist movements. Most refugees arriving to the US after 1990 were forced to flee without making preliminary plans for resettlement. This makes it difficult for them to find a support network in their host country.

=== Current challenges ===
Many immigrants in the United States suffer from structural poverty reinforced by the education system. They often settle in segregated, impoverished communities where the schools are too under-resourced to accommodate for English language learners, proven to be a significant risk factor for the educational outcomes of migrant populations. These communities oftentimes reflect redlining patterns found throughout the Jim Crow Era within the United States. Cultural differences in learning styles or thinking patterns lead to students being mislabeled as "learning disabled" or "slow", resulting their stratification among peers such as grade repetition or exclusion from necessary college preparation. Further, the dominant use of high-stakes testing in United States to make educational decisions puts English language learners at a disadvantage. Furthermore, those who do not support immigration often state that immigrants in public schools have a negative effect on native born children in the system. This conclusion has been disproved by a study by Jennifer Hunt that shows that a minimal increase (1%) of natives in public schools increases the likelihood that native born children finish 12 years of school by .03%. Education also plays a major role in the healing immigrant children need, both socially and emotionally. Policy implications affecting immigrant students in education include the lacking emphasis on bilingual and multicultural education coupled with the movement of non-immigrants to private schools, increasing the lack of public school funding to support English language learning populations.

Age at immigration and educational achievement

Children who immigrate at a relatively late age are at an educational disadvantage compared to children who immigrate at an early age. Compared to immigrants who immigrated at the age of 0–4, the educational attainment of children who immigrated at the age of 10–14 is approximately one year behind. In the case of male immigrants, children who immigrated at the age of 10–14 have 12 months less educational achievement than children who immigrated at the age of 0–4. In the case of female immigrants, children who immigrated at the age of 10–14 had 13 months (1.09 years) less educational achievement than children who immigrated at the age of 0–4. On average, children who immigrate under the age of five have about 28% higher educational achievement than children who immigrate to school-age children.

Bilingualism

Most immigrant children in the United States live at home with families who speak languages other than English. Bilingual users are advantageous in tasks that require selective attention and cognitive flexibility. In addition, children who received systematic learning opportunities in their native language as children consistently outperform those who take classes only in English. However, among adolescents who tend to share their own world, immigrant adolescents are often indifferent to maintaining their traditional language. When talking to immigrant children, pointing out that having two languages is a gift, or even a "superpower," can help them establish a sense of special ability.

=== Research-based solutions ===
A meta-analysis by Charbonneau et al. pinpointed four areas which need to be addressed: physical health, social-emotional needs, academic and language education, and school-based services. Many refugees and immigrants suffer from serious health concerns due to lack of nutrition and access to healthcare, due to inadequate or nonexistent money/insurance in the case of many immigrants, and poor living conditions and nutrition in the case of many refugees. Students with social and emotional needs are likely to suffer from severe stress or PTSD, stemming from acculturation to the new environment as well potential traumas from their past. Differences in expectations between education in the host country and country of origin may lead to increased stress and difficulty adjusting should this need not be recognized. For example, many high school-aged African refugees arriving in Australia experience considerable stress adapting scholastically being that a large number have experienced long gaps in their education. Most importantly, assistance with learning the language gives newly arrived refugees and immigrants a greater chance at adaptation. It is equally important that the language education they receive not stress rapid acquisition but proceed slowly, as has been proven most effective. Moreover, the need for school-based services in response to mental and physical health issues, and academic problems, while little studied, is of great importance for refugee and immigrant communities.

According to Naidoo, teachers need both to be open to the students and their experiences, and new ways of teaching that take into account their needs. Charbonneau et al. found that classroom settings that give students ample opportunity to share their story and culture with classmates and educators, along with well-trained tutoring services can help students improve academically and decrease stress due to acculturation pressures. Technological interventions such as digital books and computer collaborative learning have been shown to improve learning skills, cognitive functioning, and coding skills and are accompanied by a decrease in hopelessness. Career mentorship as regards school and higher education has been shown to improve student self-efficacy and assertiveness. On the whole, a multi-dimensional approach to refugee and immigrant education is necessary in order to address the many needs which are present in this population.

A study by Wenzing et al. found that early opportunities for positive contact with members of the host county, such as joint sports activities and programs, greatly increase the chances at positive adjustment for refugee and immigrant student communities. Interpreters and cultural brokers are also cited as a necessity to give the families of students a voice in their children's education. Higher levels of parental support increases optimism in youth when facing perceived Ethnic Discrimination (PED). The situation was slightly different for youth (under 20) who are refugees. In this case, the greatest increase in optimism when facing PED came when the youth felt supported by their peers. Hence, it is important to build community and support networks with both the family and the students, so that the needs of the diverse student body can be met. Findings by Naidoo stress the need for action plans that provide language education to newly arrived immigrants and refugees. This implies a need for schools to go beyond simply teaching the student, but to engage the family as well, providing them access to language education.

Beyond these recommendations, a study by Mendenhall and Bartlett identifies a comprehensive set of solutions to the problems student refugee and immigrant communities face in the US education system. A teaching approach that allows students to work with both their first language and the language of the host country is of benefit to students, as well as transnational curriculum, civic engagement, the encouragement of multi-dimensional aspirations, and pedagogy that is socio-politically aware and gives students the tools and opportunity to analyze their own situation (i.e., social space, personal experiences, and educational requirements as compared to learning geared towards their future aspirations). Tutoring is also very helpful as an extracurricular activity, as are sports, job shadowing and training, cultural activities, as well as chances to learn more about continuing education and what is needed to be successful. Equally important is the need for school staff to be cognizant of the xenophobic attitudes directed at refugee and immigrant communities both within and outside school and to engage in self-reflection on their own teaching practices with regard to how these might worsen feelings of discrimination and otherness.

== Immigration ==
=== Unaccompanied asylum-seeking children ===
In 2016, researchers Zoe Given-Wilson and Jane Herlihy systematically reviewed the psychological traumas and outcomes that asylum seekers, particularly children who are unaccompanied, face while achieving legal rights. Unaccompanied asylum-seeking children (UASC) are kids who leave their native country to seek shelter in a new country without a parent or guardian. As mentioned in the study, common reasons for leaving their county included "war, violence, sexual assault, or high levels of persecution" (Wilson, Herlihy & Hodes, 2016, pg. 267). The comprehensive review of literature also found that feeling uncertainty regarding their safety and stability affected adolescents' mental, developmental, and physical conditions.

Unaccompanied asylum-seeking children must go alone through a subjective process of being asked questions by an interviewer regarding why they are seeking refuge. They found that the traumatic experiences that asylum-seeking adolescents faced along with their brain development likely influenced the asylum-seeker interview process. For example, prior to mid-adolescence, it may be hard for an UASC to regulate emotions. In addition, lack of a parent/guardian will increase vulnerabilities to PTSD, depression, anxiety, psychosis, delinquency, and aggression. Mental health illness should be considered by the interviewer as they play a big role in how a child is viewed by the decision-maker.

The assessment of an asylum seeker's story is very important. However many times the decision-making process is subjective due to the emotional content of adolescents' asylum claims. A decision-maker's views will influence whether they believe the person. In addition, full brain maturation is not achieved until one's mid-20s, and thus influencing the interview process. Many children are not able to make decisions based on their own, instead they would rather please an interviewer. Depending on the child's cultural background, young people are faced with the difficult task of proving that their story is credible. Therefore, all aspects of a child's story and their lived experience may need to be taken into account by the interviewer.

"UASC are an especially vulnerable group to ongoing abuse and neglect"(Wilson et al., 2016, pg. 271). When adolescents file an asylum claim, they need to provide enough evidence to prove their story is credible. Several factors including age, psychological development, memory, trust, attachment, and mental health influences whether an interviewer deems someone's story as credible. Overall, the decision regarding an adolescent's claim can be subjective. Therefore, researchers note that it is imperative that the interviewer reflect on their views while speaking with unaccompanied asylum-seeking children. This will reduce biases from projecting into the interview process.

== Critical consciousness and immigrant students ==
Critical consciousness is defined as the individual's ability to recognize and effectively work against the oppression and inequality they must face in society. The inclusion of critical consciousness in schools for children and teenagers as an educational strategy has grown in popularity in recent decades. The addition of critical consciousness serves as a call to action to appropriately name and address these oppressive forces and as such could be a helpful strategy for educating immigrant students who face marginalization.

Critical consciousness can be experienced and measured on the scale of reflecting on individual beliefs, individual values and behaviors, as well as on the collective level; all of these measures play a part in another lens that examines critical consciousness from a different focal point, the group level which inspects the attitudes and beliefs of an individual as relating to the whole. That being said, an ecological perspective can be taken to determine the state of students' critical consciousness as it is a result of all the different avenues of education they receive, which is not limited to schooling. These can include but are not limited to these types of relationships: parental, peer, after-school programs, teams and any other contributor to childhood and adolescent development. Discussions with parents regarding issues of racism, violence and the roots of oppression can be an enormous support in encouraging the growth and success of children and adolescents, as well as their ability to critically reflect and commit to acting against these systems of marginalization. Additional support where schools facilitate group discussions with peers and continue to encourage and nurture students to understand their place and identity further contribute to higher levels of critical consciousness. The analysis broke up critical consciousness into subcategories worth studying such as critical reflection, political engagement, civic action, critical action (as in relation to crisis response or social activism) and critical motivation.

Qualitative studies have determined how critical consciousness could play a role in Social-Emotional development. These studies alluded to the development of critical consciousness as a means of helping the individual to have increased confidence levels and higher levels of compassion, resistance and resilience, as well as nurturing a sense of belonging and connection. In contrast, higher levels of critical self-reflection in regard to understanding the amount of oppression against them presented risks such as anxiety, depression or lack of academic engagement. However, other studies described that sociopolitical involvement coming from having critical consciousness had higher arching positive academic benefits such as increased levels of self-motivation, higher levels of achievement and better expectations around post-school careers.

Heberle, Rapa, and Farago (2020) conducted a systematic review where they examined 67 qualitative and quantitative studies on critical consciousness that spanned from 1998 to 2019. They discussed how despite being extensively studied, some of the sub-studies directly examined data and others used proxy measures to approximate and draw conclusions. As such they stated that further research is required to understand how to supplement this topic, expand upon its exciting findings and best be able to apply this knowledge to educational programs.

== Gender ==
Immigrant populations are about 1% more female than male. However, the relationship between gender and nativity is not significant overall. There are no substantial differences between Whites, Hispanics, Asians, and Multi-racial people in each given generation on educational performance. However, there are massive differences among Black immigrants, where Black women tend to perform much better than Black men in school for each successive generation.

== Employment/Income ==
Immigrants participate in the US labor force at higher rates than their native-born counterparts, and they have a lower unemployment rate by 0.3%. Two-thirds of immigrants are in the workforce, as compared to 63.1% of native-born people. However, this distinction is likely due to the fact that immigrants tend to be older than their native-born counterparts as a whole.

Possibly because more immigrant families are in the labor force, they have a significantly higher proportion of households earning an income and a significantly lower proportion of households collecting Social Security income. However, immigrants are more likely to collect SNAP (Supplemental Nutrition Assistance Program) benefits, and they have a lower median household income and per-person mean earnings.

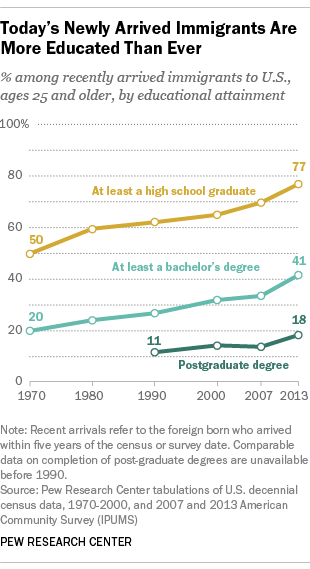
Percent among recently arrived immigrants to the US by immigration status.

Despite immigrants having a higher median income and collecting fewer benefits from the government, they are also more likely to report being below the poverty line.

Academic research has identified an "immigrant paradox" where children of immigrants (or very young immigrants), despite sociocultural limitations, often perform better than their native-born (and native family) counterparts. This is likely due to immigrants wanting to rise to their previous social standing in their country of origin.

== Economic inequality within United States' immigration ==
Economic inequality is a visible issue with immigrant households in the United States. Inequality is especially visible when examining a household's income. According to a 1998 study by researcher Edward Coulson, Hispanic households tend to have a higher income than black households; while Asian households tend to earn more than Anglos. The reasons for this inequality can vary, however education and an influx of workers can play a role, as the number of legal immigrants in the workforce increased from 200,000 in 1948 to 700,000 in 1990. One of the issues that this influx of immigrants presented is what "Economists Brian Hibbs and Gihoon Hong found that immigration is responsible for about 24 percent of the increase in income inequality among U.S. metropolitan areas between 1990 and 2000". A surplus of available workers can result in lower wages, especially with unskilled laborers. This can then result to the employers easily replacing their workforce. In a 2013 report for the Center for Immigration Studies, research found that a growth in numbers of immigrants entering the workforce has increased the size of the education/age group within the lower income bracket by 10% and reduces the wage of native-born men in that specific group by 3.7 percent and the wage of all native-born workers by 2.5 percent. Native workers lacking a high school diploma have experienced the largest negative impact on household income as a result of immigrant workers. They make up a modest share of the workforce, and tend to be among the poorest Americans. Temporary entry visas make it difficult for most temporary workers to switch employers once in the United States, due to the number of others looking for the same type of job. The number of immigrants overall has shifted dramatically throughout the past 100 years. In 1910 it was at its peak at 15% being foreign-born citizens, in 1970 it shrank to 4.7% and now has spiked to 13% in 2010. What makes the difference today is the demographic immigrating to the US. In the early 20th century, that influx of immigrants came from Southern and Eastern Europe which was closer in cultural resemblance to the developed American culture of the time as well as their labor skills being almost universal in the early factory setting. Today, "53% of immigrants are from Mexico, Central America, the Caribbean, or South America; further, about 59% of the illegal immigrant population in the United States in 2011 is from Mexico, with another 14% from El Salvador, Guatemala, and Honduras." Many immigrants come with poor English, low education and lack of any labor skills the American market needs. Other factors that this affects is the wage that these workers are and have been paid. In 1910 the immigrants were paid a lower rate due to the lack of labor laws yet to be passed. Today's immigrants have more factors to worry about than in the past, One of the main reasons for wage gaps in native-born and foreign-born Americans is skill and experience. This had led to several other issues as listed by bls.gov such as credentials, tasks, employer, location and performance. Immigrants from North Africa and the Middle East, on average, have higher levels of education and are more likely to be proficient in English and to be naturalized.

== Immigrant integration ==
The United States Government has introduced several programs to help fix and minimize economic inequality in immigrant households. This integration is defined by the Migration Policy Institute as a "process of economic mobility and social inclusion for newcomers and their children" and "touches upon the institutions and mechanisms that promote development and growth within society". With these programs the United States government is attempting to successfully give these new citizens jobs and equal opportunities.

For children and young adults, participation in the American public school system is a significant contributor to integration. Education plays a strong role in nationhood, where a sense of unity emerges among student cohorts who go through an education system together. For young migrant populations, public education serves as one of the strongest mechanisms of integration as the American education system largely focuses on "Americanization", the development of a national consciousness. Some schools are affected more than others by immigration policy, specifically Title I schools. Studies have shown that the higher the percentage of white students, the more difficult integration is for immigrants as they face more discrimination and hostility. The study by the American Education Research Journal cites the current policy on immigration enforcement as a major source of this discord.

== Origin ==
Over time, waves of immigrants have come from various parts of the world. Immediately following World War Two, nearly 60% of immigrants came from Europe. That percentage declined over time, along with immigration from Canada. In its place, immigration from Asia and Latin America rose quickly, both nearing 40% of immigration in more recent times.

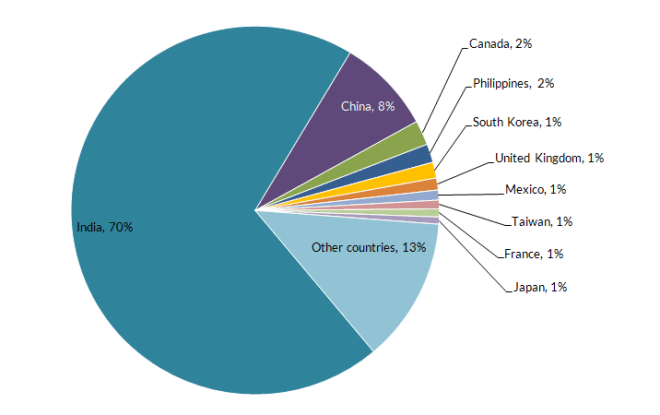
H1-B visas by origin

The pie graph shows H1-B visas, which are used in the United States to admit skilled workers, most of whom have advanced degrees.

== Generation ==
Immigrants are more likely to come to the United States at older ages. Compared to native-born populations, immigrants are much more likely to be in their late 30s through their 50s, whereas the native-born population has a contraction at those age groups. Pew Research Center predicts that by 2050, one-third of all students under the age of 17 will either be immigrants themselves or the children of at least one parent who is an immigrant.

Each generation that stays in the United States experiences a decline in educational performance as it assimilates into American society. Populations often outperform their peers in the first or second generation, but the results significantly decrease after that.

== Comparison to native population ==
The vast majority of differences between native-born populations in the US and immigrant populations are due to selection effects. These effects arise because immigrants tend to start migrating in the mid-to-late twenties, so they do not have the formal education inside their new country, nor do they have longstanding networks and connections that can help them immediately find high quality positions.

Immigrants often come to the United States to seek education, especially higher education. Native-born populations are more likely than immigrants to be out of school, and immigrant populations are more likely to be in school (especially public school systems). This means that significantly higher percentages of immigrants are still in school, which causes lower incomes at earlier ages. Despite the massive differences in earnings between native-born and immigrant populations at young ages, the differences become negligible at older ages. At every income level, native-born populations have an advantage, though that advantage fades at the highest income levels as well.

The only significant connection to nativity status is educational attainment. Immigrants are likely to have less educational attainment than native-born citizens, though this is not related to wages, age, or gender in a significant way.

== Mental health of immigrant youth ==
Mental disorders such as depression and insomnia have a great influence on learning achievement. Immigrant children are more vulnerable to mental illness than native children for many reasons. Children who move to the U.S. due to their parents' relocation of work experience the trauma of breaking up with their friends or family. The Migration Policy Institute found that 59% of immigrant school children, out of a group of 306 surveyed in the 2018–2019 school year, worried regularly about a friend or family member being deported. Refugee children entering the United States are at high risk for severe trauma, which can have a profound impact on their emotional, mental, and physical health. In 2008 a study done on unaccompanied immigrant minors, researcher Matthew Hodes, found that males had a 61.5% and females a 73.1% chance of developing posttraumatic stress disorder, much higher than their non-immigrant peers.

== See also ==
- Refugee children Education
