= Howard W. Odum =

American sociologist (1884–1954)

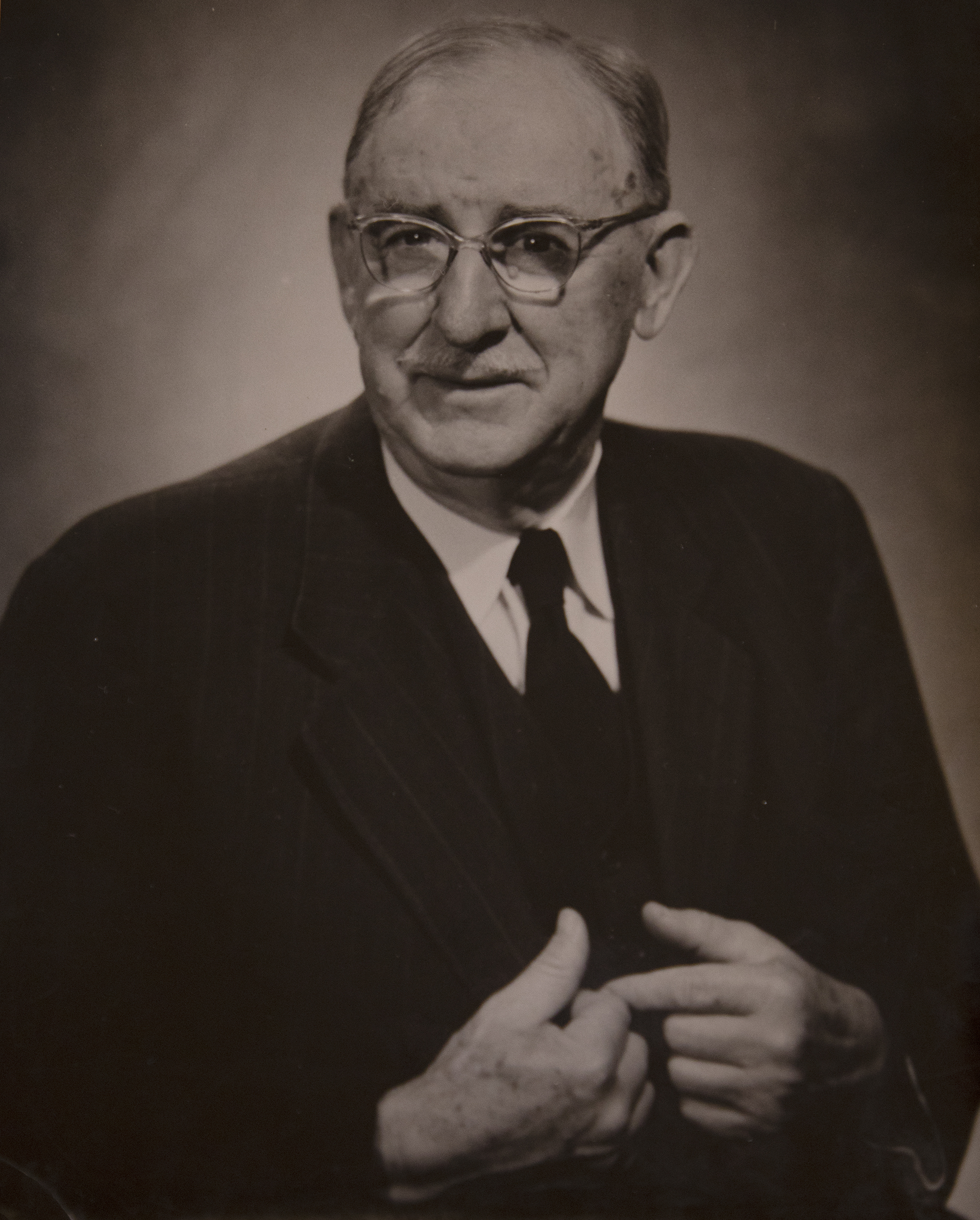
- Odum in 1953
- Born: Howard Washington Odum; May 24, 1884; Bethlehem, Georgia, U.S.
- Died: November 8, 1954 (aged 70); Chapel Hill, North Carolina, U.S.
- Education: Emory University; Clark University; Columbia University
- Children: Eugene Odum; Howard T. Odum
- Scientific career
- Fields: Sociology
- Workplaces: University of North Carolina at Chapel Hill
- Doctoral advisor: Franklin Henry Giddings
- Doctoral students: Guy Benton Johnson; Margaret Jarman Hagood

Howard Washington Odum (May 24, 1884 – November 8, 1954) was a white American sociologist and author who researched African-American life and folklore. Beginning in 1920, he served as a faculty member at the University of North Carolina, founding the university press, the journal Social Forces, and what is now the Howard W. Odum Institute for Research in Social Science, all in the 1920s. He also founded the university's School of Public Welfare, one of the first in the Southeast.

With doctorates in psychology and sociology, he wrote extensively across academic disciplines, influencing several fields and publishing three novels in addition to 20 scholarly texts.

== Early life ==
Born in 1884 in Bethlehem, Georgia, Howard W. Odum's parents, William Pleasants and Mary Ann (Thomas) Odum, encouraged his pursuit of education. He attended local schools through high school.

Odum graduated from Emory University in 1904. Working as a teacher, he collected material on Black folk lore and songs for two dissertations while completing his master's at University of Mississippi. He received his first doctorate, in psychology, at Clark University in Worcester, Massachusetts, where he studied with G. Stanley Hall. He received his second doctorate, in sociology, at Columbia University. While at Columbia, he studied with Franklin Henry Giddings, focusing on race. Both of his two dissertations on Black studies were published: the first was on religious traits in folk songs, and the second was on Black social life.

== Career ==
He authored the 1929 social science methods textbook An Introduction to Social Research.

He was appointed as assistant director of Research for President Herbert Hoover's Research Committee on Social Trends in 1933. He wrote three novels in addition to more than 20 scholarly texts, was President of the American Sociological Association in 1930, and was also a founding member of the Southern Regional Council. Odum was known for collecting extensive facts, ranging from oral history (including documentation of folk songs) to agricultural data.

His publication Southern Regions of the United States (1936) pulled together a wide variety of facts and figures about the Southeast. This book, used by government administrators, farmers, scholars, and others, remains relevant today as a historical text. Odum's prolific contribution to the social sciences has been an influence on multiple disciplines, including ecology. His sons Eugene and Howard T. Odum both became ecosystem ecologists, and frequently cited their father's holistic inquiry as an important influence in their own understanding of emergent properties and other ecological concepts.

== In academia ==
Odum became a faculty member in the School of Public Welfare (a precursor of the School of Social Work) and Department of Sociology at University of North Carolina at Chapel Hill in 1920, founding the School of Public Welfare, one of the earliest such schools in the Southeast. He was a visionary in establishing the University of North Carolina Press. While at Chapel Hill, Odum also founded the journal Social Forces in 1922 and the H.W. Odum Institute for Research in Social Science in 1924.

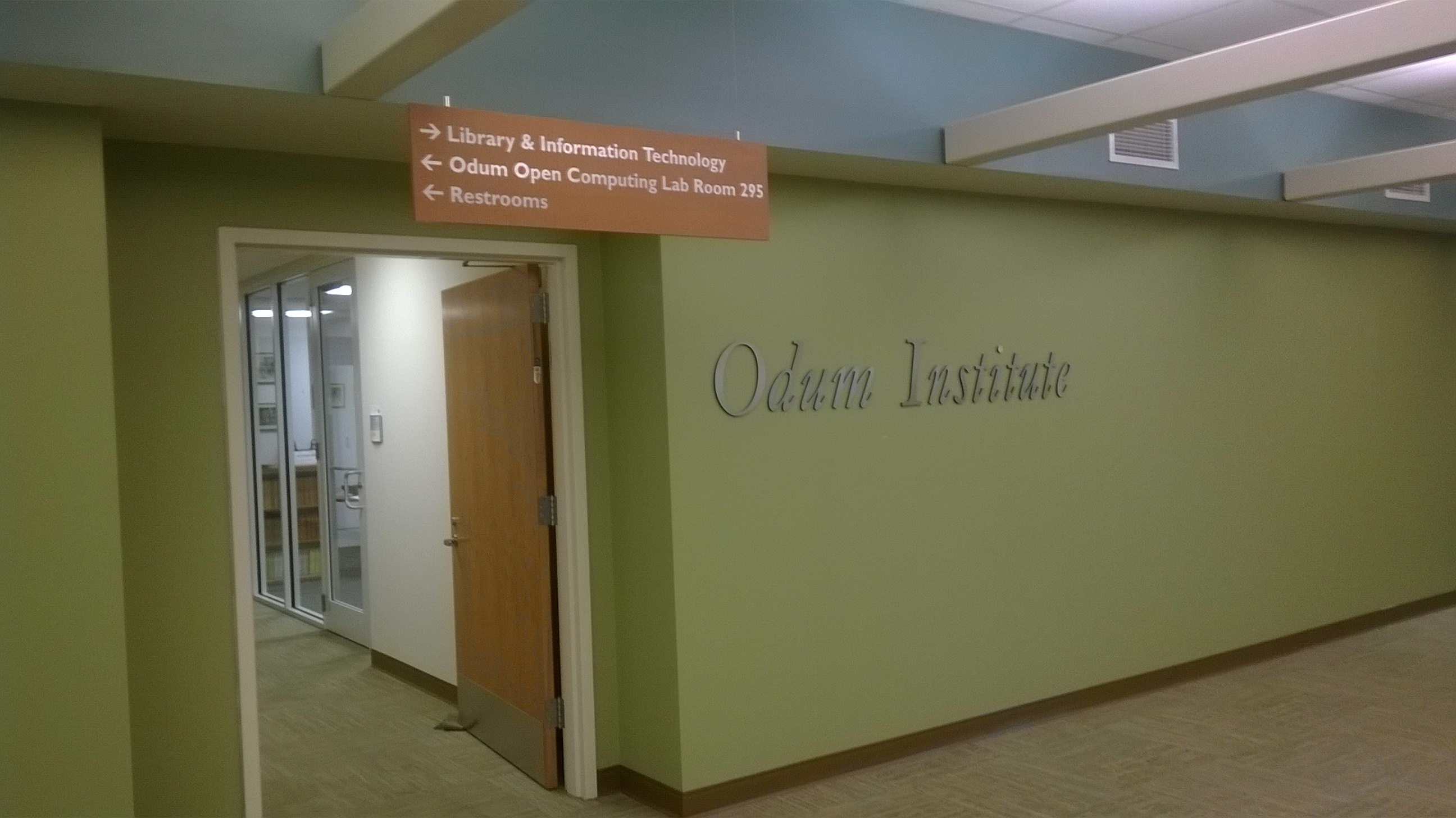
Howard W. Odum Institute, 2nd floor of Davis Library, University of North Carolina at Chapel Hill

Odum was one of the most prolific academics who influenced the early development of the University of North Carolina; his vision and academic strengths attracted other scholars to campus. Odum hired and collaborated with the university's first female faculty member. His productivity was renowned, and his scholarship reached from academic settings to the community—including influences on race relations in the American South. His book Race and Rumors of Race (1943), exploring racial tensions in the South and rising activism among Blacks, was an early documentation of the civil rights movement. Odum's views on race progressed over time, and ultimately, he was a leader, documenting folk life, hate crimes/lynchings, and the rich oral histories of African-American communities in the South. His work is difficult to classify under any discipline. Although he identified most with sociology, he was deeply committed to social welfare.

== Marriage and family ==
Odum married Anna Louise Kranz (1888–1965), also a student of Stanley Hall at Clark University. The couple had two sons, Eugene and Howard T. Odum, and a daughter, Mary Frances Odum. The men both became zoologists and recognized scholars of ecology at University of Georgia and University of Florida, respectively. Mary Frances married Phillip Schinan and lives in Chapel Hill.

== See also ==
- Black Belt in the American South
- Deep South
- Southern United States
