= Social Forces =

- Discipline: Social sciences
- Language: English
- Edited by: Arne L. Kalleberg

Publication details
- Former name: The Journal of Social Forces
- History: 1922–present
- Publisher: Oxford University Press for the Department of Sociology at the University of North Carolina at Chapel Hill
- Frequency: Quarterly
- Impact factor: 3.575 (2020)

Standard abbreviations
- ISO 4: Soc. Forces

Indexing
- ISSN: 0037-7732
- LCCN: 2001-227382
- JSTOR: 00377732
- OCLC no.: 48534262

Links
- Journal homepage; Online access; Online archive

Social Forces (formerly The Journal of Social Forces) is a quarterly peer-reviewed academic journal of social science published by Oxford University Press for the Department of Sociology at the University of North Carolina at Chapel Hill. It concentrates on sociology but also has a multidisciplinary approach, publishing works from the fields of social psychology, anthropology, political science, history, and economics. Each issue includes between 20 and 25 articles. In addition, the journal also publishes book reviews.

Social Forces was established by Howard W. Odum in 1922 as The Journal of Social Forces. The name was changed relatively quickly; since 1925 (volume 4), it has been published as Social Forces. Oxford University Press took over publication of the journal from the University of North Carolina Press in 2011.

This journal is edited by Arne L. Kalleberg (University of North Carolina at Chapel Hill).

== Abstracting and indexing ==
Social Forces is abstracted and indexed in the Social Sciences Citation Index. According to the Journal Citation Reports, the journal has a 2020 impact factor of 3.575, ranking it 23rd out of 149 journals in the category "Sociology".

== Former editors ==
- Peter R. Uhlenberg, 2006–2007
- Judith R. Blau, 2003–2006
- Richard L. Simpson, 1969–1972; 1983–2003
- Everett K. Wilson, 1972–1982
- Guy Benton Johnson, 1961–1969
- Rupert B. Vance, 1957–1969
- Gordon W. Blackwell, 1955–1956
- Katharine Jocher, 1927–1961
- Howard W. Odum, 1922–1954
