= Work and Occupations =

Peer-reviewed academic journal

- Language: English
- Edited by: Daniel B. Cornfield

Publication details
- History: 1974-present
- Publisher: SAGE Publications
- Frequency: Quarterly
- Impact factor: 2.9 (2022)

Standard abbreviations
- ISO 4: Work Occup.

Indexing
- ISSN: 0730-8884
- LCCN: 82642816
- OCLC no.: 473107382

Links
- Journal homepage; Online access; Online archive

Work and Occupations is a peer-reviewed academic journal that publishes papers in the field of Industrial Relations. The journal's editor is Daniel B. Cornfield (Vanderbilt University). It has been in publication since 1974 and is currently published by SAGE Publications.

== Scope ==
Work and Occupations aims to provide a perspective on the dynamics of the workplace and to examine international approaches to work related issues. The journal is interdisciplinary and contains scholarship in areas such as gender and race relations, immigrant and migrant workers, and violence in the workplace.

== Abstracting and indexing ==
Work and Occupations is abstracted and indexed in, among other databases: SCOPUS, and the Social Sciences Citation Index. According to the Journal Citation Reports, its 2022 impact factor is 2.9, ranking it 39 out of 149 journals in the category, ‘Sociology’, and 13 out of 30 journals in the category, ‘Industrial Relations & Labor’.
