= Eastern Sociological Society =

US non-profit organization

Eastern Sociological Society is a non-profit organization with a mission of "promoting excellence in sociological scholarship and instruction". It publishes a peer-reviewed journal (Sociological Forum) and holds a yearly academic conference, the Annual Meeting of Eastern Sociological Society.

The Eastern Sociological Society was founded in 1930 to promote the exchange of research, scholarship and professional information among sociologists in the Northeast.

== Past presidents ==
Presidents of the ESS are elected for one-year terms by their peers.

Name	Institution	Term	Reference
Robert Zussman	UMass Amherst	2011-2012	
Victor Nee	Cornell University	2017-2018	
Alejandro Portes	Princeton	2019-2020	
Jennifer Lee	Columbia University	2020-2021	
Dana R. Fisher	University of Maryland	2023-2024	
