= Judith Lorber =

American sociologist

- Born: 28 November 1931 (age 94)
- Awards: Jessie Bernard Award (1996)

Academic background
- Education: New York University
- Thesis: Going under the knife: a study of the sick role in the hospital (1971)

Academic work
- Institutions: CUNY Graduate Center and Brooklyn College, City University of New York
- Main interests: Women’s studies
- Notable ideas: Social construction of gender difference

Judith Lorber (born November 28, 1931) is professor emerita of sociology and women’s studies at The CUNY Graduate Center and Brooklyn College of the City University of New York. She is a foundational theorist of social construction of gender difference and has played a vital role in the formation and transformation of gender studies. She has more recently called for a de-gendering of the social world.

Lorber was involved in Sociologists for Women in Society from the early 1970s. She developed and taught some of the first courses in the sociology of gender, women's studies, and feminist theory at Brooklyn College and the graduate school, where she was the first coordinator of the women's studies certificate program in 1988–1991. She was chair of the ASA sex and gender section in 1992–93 and was awarded the Jessie Bernard Award in 1996 “in recognition of scholarly work that has enlarged the horizons of sociology to encompass fully the role of women in society.”

== Biography ==
Judith Lorber was born in Brooklyn New York, where she attended public elementary and high school. She graduated from Queens College, City University of New York in 1952, and received an M.A. and Ph.D. from New York University in 1971. She started developing and teaching courses in women's studies in 1972, and taught at Fordham University in the Bronx and at Brooklyn College and the CUNY Graduate Center until she retired from teaching in 1995. She lives in New York/NY.

== Work ==
=== Gender, mental health and illness ===
The main perspective of Lorber’s work has been social construction—the idea that in social interaction, people produce their identities and statuses, and at the same time, reproduce the structure and constraints of their social world. This perspective analyzes illnesses as social states in which norms and expectations for behavior will emerge from the interaction of patients and health-care workers with each other and with family members, friends, and co-workers. Lorber’s next research project (with Roberta Satow) was interviewing psychiatric residents, social workers, and indigenous paraprofessionals in a ghetto community mental health center on issues of cultural congruity with patients and the stratification of prestige and work assignments.

Judith Lorber’s last work on gender and health care, Gender and the Social Construction of Illness, was published in 1997 as part of the Gender Lens series. A second edition, which she co-authored with Lisa Jean Moore, was published by Rowman and Littlefield in 2002. The book shows that because gender is embedded in the economy, the family, politics, and the medical and legal systems, it is a major factor in the behavior of patients and health care professionals. She also co-authored Gendered Bodies: Feminist Perspectives with Lisa Jean Moore. The first edition was published by Roxbury in 2007, and the second edition by Oxford University Press in 2011. The overall perspective is that of the transformation of the body through gendered social practices.

=== Women physicians ===
Her work on women physicians, which culminated in Women Physicians: Careers, Status, and Power, published in 1984, as well as a series of papers published from 1981 to 1987, was a logical combination of her feminism and medical sociology. In it, she showed how the difficulties women physicians encountered in their career advancement when compared to a matched sample of men physicians were the result of the processes of sponsorship and patronage in the informal organization of the medical profession. She thus expanded the analysis of the informal structure of the medical profession, which had been applied only to men physicians, to women, who were, at that point, entering medical school in large numbers.

One of the physicians that Lorber met in the course of her work on women physicians, Florence Haseltine, set her on the road to her next research project—on patient's experiences with one of the new procreative technologies – in vitro fertilization (IVF), doctor-assisted conception. The research she conducted with Lakshmi Bandlamudi and Dorothy Greenfeld found that couples shaped their experiences through their behavior with clinic staff and other caretakers and with each other, creating meaning and some sense of control for themselves. Judith Lorber applied a feminist analysis to the growing use of IVF in male infertility, where the woman is fertile but the man isn't. This situation sets the stage for marital bargaining, in which the woman seemingly is in a strong position, but which turns out to the man's advantage because of his dominance in the gender politics of the family. The feminist, ethical, and medical implications of this research were explored in papers published in the late 1980s.

=== Feminist politics ===
Lorber’s feminism (and love of science fiction thinking) appeared in print as early as 1975 in "Beyond Equality of the Sexes: The Question of the Children," followed by "Dismantling Noah's Ark" in 1986. In 1987, she became the founding editor of Gender & Society, the official publication of Sociologists for Women in Society(SWS). As a hands-on editor, Judith Lorber shaped the papers, the linguistic style, and the emerging themes. The journal was (and still is) extremely successful and is the main source of SWS’s current finances. She and Susan Farrell edited the first Gender & Society reader, The Social Construction of Gender, published in 1991.

By 1990, Lorber made a significant contribution to gender studies by writing her own book that has since then become a bible and mandatory reading in women’s studies classes. Paradoxes of Gender, published by Yale in 1994, contends that sex, sexuality, and gender are all socially constructed but that gender is the overarching category—a major social status that organizes almost all areas of social life. Therefore, bodies and sexuality are gendered—biology, physiology, and sexuality do not add up to gender, which is a social institution that establishes patterns of expectations for individuals, orders the social processes of everyday life, is built into the major social organizations of society, and is also an entity in and of itself. Lorber's theoretical approach to gender is masterful and unusual by mainstream empirical social science standards. Paradoxes has been translated into Italian and German and has influenced a generation of graduate students in the United States and other countries. The first chapter, “Night to His Day: The Social Construction of Gender,” has been widely anthologized, as has a paper based on the second chapter, “Believing is Seeing: Biology as Ideology.” The book has impacted not only sociology, but also the fields of anthropology, history, social psychology, sociolinguistics, men's studies, culture studies, and even law.

Gender Inequalities: Feminist Theories and Politics was first published in 1998 by Roxbury and is now in its fifth edition, published by Oxford University Press in 2012. It sums up the last 35 years of feminist thought. Revisioning Gender, which she co-edited with Beth Hess and Myra Marx Ferree, was published by Sage in 1999. It is a collection of original essays in different areas of social research that have been changed by the use of gender as a conceptual framework. She co-edited the Handbook of Gender and Women’s Studies, published by Sage UK in 2006 with Mary Evans and Kathy Davis.

=== "Toward a World Beyond Gender" ===
Lorber’s current work is to go “beyond.” In "Beyond the Binaries: Depolarizing the Categories of Sex, Sexuality, and Gender," published in Sociological Inquiry in 1996, she argued that sociological data would be more accurate if it used more than the two polarized categories of sex, sexuality, and gender. In “Crossing Borders and Erasing Boundaries: Paradoxes of Identity Politics,” published in Sociological Focus in 1999, she pulled apart racial and transgender categories. In fact, Judith Lorber has gone so far as to argue that we should imagine a social world that is not organized by gender. She explored this idea in “Using Gender to Undo Gender: A Feminist Degendering Movement, ” published in Feminist Theory in 2000. Breaking the Bowls: Degendering and Social Change puts together all the "beyond" ideas and asks us to imagine a world without gender. It was published in 2005 by W.W. Norton.

At the 2012 American Sociological Association Annual Meetings, held in Denver, the theme was "utopias." Judith Lorber gave an invited presentation at the opening plenary: "Gender Equality: Utopian and Realistic." She also presented an invited paper, "Toward a World Beyond Gender: A Utopian Vision," with Barbara J. Risman and Jessica Holden Sherwood. Recently, she has written and given presentations about the heroine of the popular Stieg Larsson trilogy – "The Gender Ambiguity of Lisbeth Salander: Third-wave Feminist Hero?"

=== "Believing Is Seeing: Biology as Ideology" ===
Judith Lorber is published in Chapter 3 of "The Gendered Society Reader," an anthology edited by Michael S. Kimmel; Amy Aronson; and Amy Kaler, with a text titled "Believing Is Seeing: Biology as Ideology."

In the text, Lorber discusses the social constructs built into our society differentiating the genders. Lorber argues that “bodies differ in many ways physiologically; but they are completely transformed by social practices to fit into the salient categories of a society, the most pervasive of which are 'female' and ‘male and ‘women’ and 'men'". Moreover, Lorber points out that though the physiological differences of the sexes are there, each individual body does not always fit into its own category and "neither sex nor gender are pure categories". Lorber exemplifies this by separating the genders and discussing differences within the separate ‘female’ and ‘male’ categories; she argues some women do not have ovaries and uteri, menopause differentiates menstruating women for those who do not, some men lactate, and some men cannot produce sperm. As she discusses the blurred lines surrounding individual bodies within their gender categories, she continues to exemplify the pre-determined social classifications surrounding gender in our society by using competitive sports.

In Lorber’s section of this Chapter 3 headed ‘What Sports Illustrate,’ she argues that the pre-determined societal beliefs surrounding gender have turned competitive sports into a way for men to legitimize aggression and create their masculine identity. Conversely, Lorber believes that the female sex in competitive sports is made a mockery of and continually takes a "secondary status" to competitive male sports. Lorber uses the example of basketball to confirm her belief. She correlates the female secondary status to assumptions surrounding women’s physiology. As well Lorber believes this assumption of physiology influences rules in women's sports, rules in sporting competitions, and how women are treated in sporting competitions.

However, Lorber connects these social barriers that continually separate the sexes in sports, with the economical barriers oppressing the female sex. She compares competitive sports to big businesses and therefore argues that they are no longer just a social construct but an economic, political, and ideological issue developed by those who define and profit from competitive sports.

Lorber continues to describe social boundaries set up by gender using technology; she brings up two examples—computers and cars. When computers first came into use, office jobs involving them were given to women, as it appeared to be a clerical duty. It was not until computers were revealed to be complex and intellectually demanding that they became the domain of men. "By the 1960s programing was split into more and less skilled specialties, and the entry of women into the computer field in the 1970s and 1980s was confined to the lower paid specialties…employers invoked women and men’s purportedly natural capabilities for the jobs for which they were hired". This means women will do the more menial tasks, where men will shape the industry and control it. Lorber also describes how this has influenced young people; for example we see far more young men and boys playing computer games and getting involved in computer clubs. In this way we are furthering women’s supposed natural disadvantage with computers by allowing boys to get more education and comfort with computers than girls.

This pattern of male control over technology continues when it comes to cars. Lorber references the fact that in couples a man will almost always be the more frequent driver, regardless of aptitude. This may seem like an inconsequential example, but Lorber asks us to consider in different contexts what a vehicle can mean. She describes the importance of the mobility, literally and figuratively, given to women by driving. Feminists used driving "to campaign for women’s suffrage in parts of the United States not served by public transportation and they effectively used motorcades and speaking from cars as campaign tactics". Lorber also describes the sense of liberation felt by many women when they first experienced driving, while participating in First World War efforts. This gendering of who a driver can be does limit women’s options in the world more than we consider when we simply see the male in a couple taking the wheel.

Lorber finalizes her arguments discussing the paradoxes of human nature. She confirms, "gendered people do not emerge from physiology or hormones, but from the exigencies of the social order". Lorber points out that the diversity of humans could be categorized, regrouped and broken up into different ways of comparison than the traditional sex differentiation that disregards the real issues of who is truly like whom. She argues that the problem of basing knowledge on presumptions of gender differences reaffirms the categorization of the ‘male’ versus 'female'. When relying on the conventional categorization of gender, one is able to find what they are looking for. Lorber states, "we see what we believe, whether it is that ‘female’ and 'males' are essentially different or that 'women' and ‘men’ are essentially the same.

== Selected honors and awards ==
Judith Lorber received the American Sociological Association’s Jessie Bernard Career Award in 1996 for "scholarly work that has enlarged the horizons of sociology to encompass fully the role of women in society." She was president of the Eastern Sociological Society in 2001–2002, Chair of the Sex and Gender Section of the American Sociological Association in 1993, and president of Sociologists for Women in Society in 1981–82.

She has held several international visiting professorships. In 1992–1993, she had a Fulbright Award for lecturing at Bar Ilan University and for research in Israel. She was guest professor at Åbo Akademi, Turku, Finland, in 1996. In 1997, she held the Marie Jahoda International Visiting Professorship of Feminist Studies at Ruhr University, Bochum, Germany. In the last few years, she has been a visiting professor at the University of Dortmund, Germany, the Carl von Ossietzky University, Oldenburg, Germany and served as a Fulbright Senior Specialist at Bar Ilan University.

Lorber was invited and has given conference presentations in almost every state in the US, and she has had two Eastern Sociological Society Lectureships (Maurice Falk in 1978 and 1981 and Robin Williams in 1996–1997) and the Sociologists for Women in Society Feminist Lectureship in 1992. She was invited to present her work at international sociology and women’s studies conferences in China, Africa, South Korea, Australia, Canada, Israel, Scandinavia, the United Kingdom, Ireland, France, Germany, and Switzerland.

== Books ==
Lorber has published a number of books including:

- The New Gender Paradox: Fragmentation and Persistence of the Binary, Cambridge, UK, Polity, 2022.
- Otre il Gender, Bologna, il Mulino, 2022.
- La nueva paradoja del genero, Barcelona, Paidos, 2023.
- Gendered Bodies: Feminist Perspectives, 2nd ed. (with Lisa Jean Moore). New York: Oxford, 2011.
- Gender Inequality: Feminist Theories and Politics, 5th Ed. New York: Oxford, 2012.
- Breaking the Bowls: Degendering and Feminist Change. New York: W.W. Norton, 2005.
- Gender and the Social Construction of Illness, 2nd ed. (with Lisa Jean Moore). Walnut Creek, California: Altamira Press, 2002.
- Paradoxes of Gender. New Haven, Connecticut: Yale University Press, 1994.
- Gender-Paradoxien. (Trans. Hella Beister). Leverkusen, Germany: Leske & Budrich, 1999.
- L'Invenzione dei Sessi, translated by Vittorio Lingiardi. Milan: Il Saggiatore, 1995.
- Women Physicians: Careers, Status, and Power. New York and London: Tavistock, 1984.

Her co-edited works include:

- Handbook of Gender Studies and Women Studies (co-editor with Mary Evans and Kathy Davis). London: Sage, 2006.
- Revisioning Gender (co-editor with Myra Marx Ferree and Beth B. Hess). Thousand Oaks, California: Sage, 1999.
- The Social Construction of Gender (co-editor with Susan A. Farrell). Thousand Oaks, California: Sage, 1991.
