= Jessie Bernard Award =

The Jessie Bernard Award is given by the American Sociological Association in recognition of scholarly work that has enlarged the horizons of sociology to encompass fully the role of women in society. The contribution may be in empirical research, theory or methodology. It is presented for significant cumulative work done throughout a professional career, and is open to women or men and is not restricted to sociologists."

ASA Jessie Bernard Award was originally a biennial award for career and/or publication, and is now annual. The award is named after Jessie Bernard.

== Recipients ==
The Award was originally a biennial award for career and/or publication, and is now annual.

- 2025 - Manisha Desai
- 2024 - Cecilia Menjívar
- 2023 - Raka Ray
- 2022 - Marlese Durr
- 2021 - Jyoti Puri
- 2020 - Jennifer Glass
- 2019
  - Rhacel Salazar Parreñas
  - Bandana Purkayastha
- 2018 - No award presented
- 2017 - Raewyn Connell, career
- 2016 - Ronnie J. Steinberg, career
- 2015 - Nancy A. Naples, career
- 2014
  - Esther Ngan-ling Chow, career
  - Christine L. Williams, career
- 2013 - Kathleen Gerson, career
- 2012 - Michael A. Messner, career
- 2011 - Verta Taylor, career
- 2010 - Harriet Presser, career
- 2009 - Cecilia L. Ridgeway, career
- 2008 - Arlie Hochschild, career
- 2007 - Patricia Yancey Martin, career
- 2006 - Margaret L. Andersen, career
- 2005 - Evelyn Nakano Glenn, career
- 2004 - Myra Marx Ferree, career
- 2003 - Cynthia Fuchs Epstein, career
- 2002 - Barrie Thorne, career
- 2001 - Barbara Laslett, career
- 2000 - Maxine Baca Zinn, career
- 1999 - Paula England, career
- 1998 - Ruth A. Wallace, career
- 1997
  - Nona Glazer, career;
  - Robbie Pfeufer Kahn, Bearing Meaning: The Language of Birth (University of Illinois Press, 1995);
    - Honorable Mention: Pierrette Hondagneu-Sotelo, Gendered Transitions: Mexican Experiences of Immigration (University of California Press, 1994).
- 1996
  - Judith Lorber, career;
  - Diane L. Wolf, Factory Daughters (University of California Press, 1992).
- 1995
  - Arlene Kaplan Daniels, career;
  - Ruth Frankenberg, White Women, Race Matters: The Social Construction of Whiteness (Minnesota);
  - Elizabeth Lapovsky Kennedy and Madeline D. Davis, Boots of Leather, Slippers of Gold: The History of A Lesbian Community (Routledge).
- 1993
  - Dorothy Smith, career;
  - Memphis State University Center for Research on Women (Bonnie Thornton Dill, Elizabeth Higginbotham, Lynn Weber) for significant collective work;
  - Patricia Hill Collins, Black Feminist Thought: Knowledge, Consciousness, and the Politics of Empowerment.
- 1991 - Barbara Katz Rothman, Recreating Motherhood: Ideology and Technology in a Patriarchical Society (W.W. Norton & Co., 1989).
- 1989
  - Joan Acker, career;
  - Samuel R. Cohn, The Process of Occupational Sex Typing: The Feminization of Clerical Labor in Great Britain (Temple University Press, 1985);
    - Honorable Mention: Karen Brodkin Sacks, Caring by the Hour (University of Illinois Press).
- 1987
  - Sandra Harding, The Science Question in Feminism (Cornell University Press, 1986);
  - Judith Rollins, Between Women: Domestics and Their Employers (Temple University Press, 1986).
- 1985
  - Joan Huber, career;
  - Judith G. Stacey, Patriarchy and the Socialist Revolution in China.
- 1983 - Alice Rossi, career
- 1981 - Elise Boulding, career
- 1979
  - Valerie Kincaid Oppenheimer, The Female Labor Force in the United States: Demographic and Economic Factors Governing Its Growth and Changing Composition (University of California and Greenwood Press);
  - Nancy Chodorow, The Reproduction of Mothering: Psychoanalysis and the Sociology of Gender (University of California Press);
    - Honorable Mention to Kristin Luker, Taking Chances: Abortion and the Decision Not to Contracept (University of California Press).

== See also ==
- List of social sciences awards
