= Esther Ngan-ling Chow =

Chinese-born American sociologist

- Born: 1943
- Died: 2022 (aged 78–79)

Academic background
- Education: University of California, Los Angeles

Chinese name
- Traditional Chinese: 周顏玲
- Simplified Chinese: 周颜玲
- Hanyu Pinyin: Zhōu Yánlíng
- Yale Romanization: Jāu Ngàahnlìhng

Dr Esther Ngan-ling Chow (born 1943) was a sociologist and Emerita Professor at the American University, Washington D.C., United States.

She was among the first sociologists to conduct sociological analyses of the intersectionality of race, class, and gender in the case of Asian American women.

== Early life and education ==
Chow grew up in China, and attended a school for talented girls. She moved to the United States in 1966 for her graduate studies, and completed her PhD in sociology at the University of California, Los Angeles.

== Career ==
After completing her PhD, Chow joined the faculty at the American University. Her research and teaching interests are feminist, and focus on intersectionality, migration, family, work, and globalization. She has been described as a pioneer of intersectional sociological analyses, particularly in contributing to the understanding of the experiences of women of color. Her work has highlighted the relative lack of visibility of Asian American women in second-wave feminism.

She has been the Chair of the Asia and Asian America Section of the American Sociological Association, and Vice President of the Eastern Sociological Society. She also served on the editorial boards of the academic journals Gender & Society, International Sociology, Teaching Sociology.

In 2010 the Sociologists for Women in Society established a dissertation scholarship named after Chow and sociologist Mary Joyce Green.

Chow retired from the American University in 2011, after 37 years on the faculty.

== Selected publications ==
- Women, the Family, and Policy: A Global Perspective (1994)
- Race, Class and Gender: Common Bonds and Difference Voices (1996)
- Transforming Gender and Development in East Asia (2002)
- Contours of Citizenship: Women, Diversity and Practices of Citizenship (2010)

== Awards ==
- Jessie Bernard Award from the American Sociological Association (2014)
- Feminist Activism Award (2008) from the Sociologists for Women in Society
- Outstanding Teaching Award from the Asia and Asian America Section of the American Sociological Association (2007)
- Stuart A. Rice Merit Award for Career Achievement (2006)
- Fulbright New Century Scholar award (2004–2005)
- Morris Rosenberg Award for Recent Achievement from the District of Columbia Sociological Society (2002)
- Mentoring Award from the Sociologists for Women in Society (2000)

== Personal life ==
Chow established the True Light Foundation, an organisation working to reduce poverty and increase educational opportunities for children in rural China.
