= Ruth A. Wallace =

American sociologist and academic

Ruth Ann Wallace
- Died: May 2016
- Known for: Sociology of gender; sociology of religion; sociological theory
- Awards: Jessie Bernard Award (1998)

Academic background
- Education: Immaculate Heart College (B.A.); University of Notre Dame (M.A., Ph.D.)

Academic work
- Institutions: George Washington University

Ruth Ann Wallace was a sociologist and professor.

Her research interests were in sociological theory, sociology of gender, and sociology of religion.

Wallace died in May 2016 from a stroke and complications with Alzheimer's disease.

== Education ==
Wallace graduated with a B.A. from Immaculate Heart College in 1961, and an M.A. in Sociology at the University of Notre Dame in 1963.

Her PhD dissertation was on the social determinants of change of religious affiliation.

== Career ==
Wallace taught at George Washington University for 31 years. She was president of the Association for the Sociology of Religion and the Society for the Scientific Study of Religion.

=== Awards ===
She was awarded the Jessie Bernard Award by the American Sociological Association in 1998.

Her other awards include the Stuart Rice Award for Outstanding Contributions to Sociology by the District of Columbia Sociological Society, the H. Paul Douglass Lecturer by the Religious Research Association, the Joseph McGee Lecturer by Marquette University, and was a Distinguished Visiting Scholar at Santa Clara University.

== Publications ==
- Wallace, Ruth (2003). They Call Him Pastor: Married Men in Charge of Catholic Parishes. Paulist press. ISBN 9780809141715.
- Wallace, Ruth; Wolf, Alison (1999). Contemporary Sociological Theory: Expanding the Classical Tradition. Prentice Hall. ISBN 9780131850514.
- Wallace, Ruth; Meadow Orlans, Kathryn (1994). Gender and the Academic Experience: Berkeley Women Sociologists. Lincoln, New England: Prentice Hall. ISBN 9780803286061.
- Wallace, Ruth (1992). They Call Her Pastor: A New Role for Catholic Women. Albany, New York: State University of New York Press. ISBN 9780791409251.
- Wallace, Ruth, ed. (1989). Feminism and Sociological Theory. SAGE Publications. ISBN 9780803933989.
