= Harriet Presser =

American sociologist and demographer

Harriet B. Presser
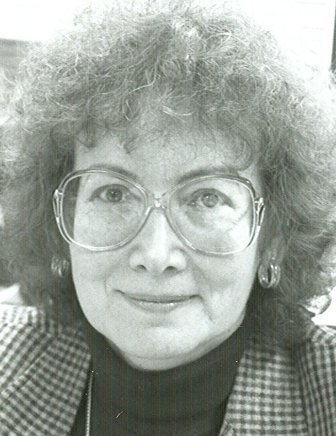
- Born: 1936
- Died: May 1, 2012 (aged 75–76)
- Education: George Washington University (BA in Sociology); University of North Carolina, Chapel Hill (MA in Sociology); University of California, Berkeley (PhD in Sociology)
- Occupation: University teacher
- Awards: Jessie Bernard Award (2010)
- Academic career
- Fields: Sociology and demography
- Institutions: University of Maryland (1976–2012)

Harriet B. Presser (1936–2012) was a sociologist and demographer. Having served on the faculty at the University of Maryland, College Park, for more than 30 years, at the time of her death she was a Distinguished University Professor. She was elected president of the Population Association of America for the year 1989. In addition, she was awarded the Jessie Bernard Award from the American Sociological Association in 2010, and was elected as a Fellow to the American Association for the Advancement of Science in 2002. As a scholar, she studied the intersection of gender, work and family, and pioneered the sociological specialization in that area. She was widely recognized for bringing a feminist perspective to the demographic study of such issues as fertility, child care, housework, and the effects of the global 24/7 service economy.

In 2009, the International Union for the Scientific Study of Population held a special session in her honor, titled "Cross-Cultural Challenges to Research on Gender and Population", at its 26th International Population Conference in Marrakesh.

== Research contributions ==
In 1969, Presser reported on the unprecedented levels of female sterilization on the island of Puerto Rico. According to her 1965 data, 34% of mothers ages 20–49 had been sterilized, resulting in a rapid drop in the island's fertility rate. The Puerto Rican case eventually was exposed as one of the most egregious cases of compulsory sterilization policies.

In the 1970s, she published extensively on the timing of fertility and its consequences for women's adult lives. The research helped establish the critical importance of the timing of first births and whether they were planned.

In the 1980s Presser studied the challenges of child care, its affordability and availability. In particular, she pointed out that as women entered the labor force at higher rates, child care posed problems both for families and for the organization of the workplace. This was the subject of her presidential address to the Population Association of America, "Can We Make Time for Children?"

In 1983, in the journal Science, Presser and Virginia Cain reported that one-third of dual-earner families with children had a spouse working outside of "regular" working hours. In a subsequent study, Presser found that husbands were more likely to do housework if they were home when their wives were working. That was early evidence of how families with children juggled time demands when both spouses were working, and highlighted the inadequacy of available, affordable child care options.

Over the course of her research on work-family intersections, Presser played an instrumental role in establishing the need for better data collection regarding both child care arrangements and the timing of work hours (rather than simply their quantity). While much of the research on economic transformations in the late 20th century focused on globalization and changes in manufacturing, Presser's work showed that it was local pressures—especially the demands of the 24-hour service economy and the lack of child care options—that often drove families into hard choices. This line of research culminated in her 2003 book, Working in a 24/7 Economy: Challenges for American Families, published by the Russell Sage Foundation, which supported the work.

When Working in a 24/7 Economy was published, it was featured in news reports about the family stress and health impacts of long and irregular work hours, published in the New York Times, the Christian Science Monitor, and USA Today. Publications that reviewed the book include Science and the American Journal of Sociology.

== Selected bibliography ==
=== Books ===
- Presser, Harriet (1973). Sterilization and fertility decline in Puerto Rico. Berkeley: Institute of International Studies, University of California. ISBN 9780877253136.
- Presser, Harriet B.; Sen, Gita (2000). Women's empowerment and demographic processes: moving beyond Cairo. New York: Oxford University Press. ISBN 9780198297314.
- Presser, Harriet B. (2003). Working in a 24/7 economy: challenges for American families. New York: Russell Sage Foundation. ISBN 9780871546715.

=== Journal articles ===
- Presser, Harriet B. (1998). "Decapitating the U.S. Census Bureau's "Head of Household": Feminist mobilization in the 1970s". Feminist Economics. 4 (3): 145–158. doi:10.1080/135457098338356. PMID 12294932.

== Harriet B. Presser Award ==
In 2009, the Population Association of America established the Harriet B. Presser Award, given biennially for career contributions to the study of gender and demography. The recipients of the award have been:

- 2009: Valerie Kincaid Oppenheimer
- 2011: Karen Oppenheim Mason
- 2013: Ruth Dixon-Mueller
- 2015: Paula England
- 2017: Frances Goldscheider
- 2019: Jennifer Glass
- 2021: Diana Greene Foster
- 2023: Elizabeth Heger Boyle
- 2025: Sonalde Desai
