= Myra Marx Ferree =

American sociologist (born 1949)

- Born: October 10, 1949 (age 77)

Academic background
- Education: Harvard University

Academic work
- Discipline: sociology
- Institutions: University of Wisconsin–Madison
- Main interests: feminist organizations and politics gender inequality gender in sociological theory intersectionality

Myra Marx Ferree (born October 10, 1949) is an American sociologist, serving as the Alice H. Cook Professor of Sociology at the University of Wisconsin–Madison. She was formerly a director of the Center for German and European Studies at the University of Wisconsin–Madison, where she was also a member of the Women's Studies Program. In 2005 she was a Berlin Prize Fellow at the American Academy in Berlin and in 2004 the Maria-Jahoda Visiting professor at the Ruhr University Bochum. Ferree retired in 2018. As of 2026, she is president of the Guild of Scholars of the Episcopal Church.

== Life ==
Ferree attended Harvard University where she obtained a PhD in social psychology and social relations in 1976.

She has written numerous articles about feminist organizations and politics in the US, Germany and internationally, as well as about gender inequality in families, the inclusion of gender in sociological theory and practice, and the intersections of gender with race and class. Her current work focuses on comparisons between US and German feminist movements and gender policy developments since the 1960s as well as the development of feminist identities in transnational women's organizations.

She has been the recipient of the Jessie Bernard Award (sociology's highest honor for work in gender), vice-president of the American Sociological Association and deputy editor of its leading journal, American Sociological Review, president of Sociologists for Women in Society and recipient of its mentoring and feminist scholarship awards.

== Works (selection) ==
- Global Feminism: Transnational Women's Activism, Organizing, and Human Rights, New York: New York University Press, 2006 (eds. with Aili Mari Tripp) ISBN 9780814727362
- Shaping Abortion Discourse: Democracy and the Public Sphere in Germany and the United States, Cambridge University Press, 2001 (eds. with William Anthony Gamson, Jürgen Gerhards, and Dieter Rucht) ISBN 9780521790451
- Controversy and Coalition: The New Feminist Movement Across Four Decades of Change, Routledge Press, 1995 (with Beth Hess) ISBN 9780415928045
- Revisioning Gender, Alta Mira Press, 1998 (eds. with Judith Lorber and Beth Hess) ISBN 9780761906162
- Feminist Organizations: Harvest of the New Women's Movement, Temple University Press, 1995 (eds. with Patricia Yancey Martin) ISBN 9781566392297
