= Barbara Katz Rothman =

American sociologist and professor (born 1948)

- Born: 1948 (age 77–78); Brooklyn, New York, U.S.
- Education: Brooklyn College, City University of New York; New York University
- Awards: Mentoring Awards (Sociologists for Women in Society, Eastern Sociological Society); Lee Founders Award (Society for the Study of Social Problems); Midwifing the Movement Award (Midwives Alliance of North America)
- Scientific career
- Fields: Sociology
- Workplaces: City University of New York

Barbara Katz Rothman (born 1948) is an American sociologist. She is a professor of sociology and women's studies at the City University of New York (CUNY). Her work encompasses medical sociology, childbirth and midwifery, bioethics, race, disability, food studies, and the sociology of knowledge.

== Biography ==
Barbara Katz Rothman was born in Brooklyn, New York in 1948. She received her undergraduate and master's degrees from Brooklyn College and in 1979 a Ph.D. in sociology from New York University. In 1979, she became a faculty member of Baruch College and the Graduate Center of the City University of New York.

She was one of the first sociologists to look seriously at childbirth, resulting in her dissertation and first book, In Labor. She moved on to study issues in prenatal diagnosis, and the consequences of the newly developing technologies of amniocentesis and other genetic testing in pregnancy for the women involved, resulting in The Tentative Pregnancy.

In 1987, she joined other feminists of the time, including Gloria Steinem, Betty Friedan, Phyllis Chesler, Mary Daly, and Evelyn Fox Keller to write an amicus brief opposing surrogacy in the Baby M case. The brief argues that allowing women to charge a fee for bearing another couple's child would lead to their exploitation having been reduced to a commodity. The Baby M case signified an advancement in reproductive technology and was the impetus for Recreating Motherhood: Ideology and Technology in a Patriarchical Society, published in 1989. In the book, Katz Rothman emphasizes the social, political and technological implications of birthing and raising a child in a patriarchal society. She discusses the legal parental rights of the birth mother and child-care providers and argues for a shift in reproductive practices in order to reflect the collective experiences of women. In 1991, she was awarded the Jessie Bernard Award by the American Sociological Association for Recreating Motherhood.

In 1993, she was president of the Society for the Study of Social Problems, which has awarded her the Lee Founders Award in 2006, and the Mentoring Award in 2019. In 1995, she was awarded a Fulbright Professorship to the University of Groningen, in the Netherlands. In 1998, she was the president of the Sociologists for Women in Society (SWS), from which she won the Mentoring Award in 1995 and the SWS Feminist Lecturer Award in 1988. She also received an award for “Midwifing the Movement” from the Midwives Alliance of North America (MANA) in 2012. She was the president of the Eastern Sociological Society for the 2016 presidential term, and was the recipient of the Fulbright-Saastamoinen Foundation Distinguished Chair in Health Sciences 2018–2019.

== Journals and popular media ==
Barbara Katz Rothman is widely published in both popular and scholarly sources, including Social Problems, Virtual Mentor of the AMA, MIDIRS Midwifery Digest, Annual Review of Health Sciences of Australia, The Japanese Midwifery Journal, The MT. Sinai Journal of Medicine, Gender & Society, Fetal Diagnosis and Therapy, NOVA Law Review, The Journal of Bioethical Inquiry, The Chronicle of Higher Education, MS., Glamour, European Journal of Obstetrics & Gynecology and Reproductive Biology, MAMM, Conscience, Midwifery Today, and Legal Affairs. Katz Rothman coined the term "midwifery model" to distinguish the work of home birth midwives from standard medical practice around birth, the "medical model."

== Books ==
Year	Title	Co-Author	Publisher	Note
1982	In Labor		Norton	Paperback title Giving Birth, updated and rewritten as Laboring On, with Wendy Simonds as co-author. Introduced the widely used term "Midwifery Model" contradistinction to the standard medical approach to birth.
1986	The Tentative Pregnancy		Viking	The first book length study of women's experiences with prenatal testing, was published in Germany in 1991.
1989	Recreating Motherhood		Norton	1991 recipient of the Jessie Bernard Award of the American Sociological Association.
1992	Centuries of Solace: Expressions of Maternal Grief in Popular Literature	Co-author Wendy Simonds	Temple University Press	
1993	The Encyclopedia of Childbearing		Oryx Press and Holt Publishers	Named an Outstanding Reference Book by the American Library Association.
2001	The Book of Life		Beacon	Originally titled Genetic Maps and Human Imaginations, Norton, 1998. Rothman discusses the social, ethical and racial issues involved in the Human Genome Project. Some themes explored include the social constructions of race, the issues with studying genetic differences between races, how new genetic technologies alter the public's understanding of health, and the ethics of prenatal screening for genetic diseases. She includes both evidence-based research and personal experience to support her arguments.
2005	Weaving a Family: Untangling Race and Adoption		Beacon	Perhaps the book developed from her own experience as a white mother adopting an African American descent newborn.
	Advances in Medical Sociology			Series Editor
2008	Bioethical Issues, Sociological Perspectives	Editor with Elizabeth Armstrong and Rebecca Tiger	Elsevier	
2010	Race in an Era of Change: A Reader	Heather Dalmage	Oxford University Press	
2012	Brave New World of Reproduction: Texts on Pregnancy, Birth and Genetic Diagnosis		Mabuse-Verlag, Germany	Translation to German by Hildburg Wegener, original collection.
2016	A Bun in the Oven: How the Food and Birth Movements Resist Industrialization		New York University Press	A Bun in the Oven traces and compares the food and the birth movements throughout the 20th century.
2021	The Biomedical Empire: Lessons Learned from the Covid-19 Pandemic		Stanford University Press	Critical and sociological analysis of the "biomedical industrial complex"
