= Marlese =

Marlese is a female given name. Notable people with the name include:

- Marlese Durr, American sociologist
- Marlese Sifre, Puerto Rican lawyer and politician
