= Cynthia Fuchs Epstein =

American sociologist and emeritus distinguished professor

- Education: Columbia University
- Known for: Gender and labor
- Scientific career
- Fields: Sociology
- Workplaces: CUNY Graduate Center
- Thesis: Women and Professional Careers: The Case of the Woman Lawyer (1968)
- Academic advisors: Robert K. Merton

Cynthia Fuchs Epstein is an American sociologist and Distinguished Professor Emerita at the CUNY Graduate Center. Fuchs Epstein served as president of the American Sociological Association in 2006.

== Education ==
At Columbia University, Fuchs Epstein received a grant of $1,000 from the Institute of Life Insurance to study the American family. Her study showed that women were beginning to enter the workforce at higher rates than they previously had, but there still weren't many jobs considered appropriate for women, which locked women out of prestigious professions and prevented upward mobility.

For her dissertation, Fuchs Epstein analyzed the factors that affected women's exclusion and inclusion in the professional realm, focusing on female lawyers. She studied a sample of women lawyers who found ways around the prevalent gender discrimination.

== Career ==
In 1966, she joined a number of other women who were academics or in other professional positions to form the National Organization for Women in New York City. She also actively participated in professional women's groups such as Sociologists for Women in Society and the Professional Women's Caucus.

For her first study after completing her graduate education, she studied Black female professionals whom she interviewed about the various factors that made it possible for them to achieve their positions despite the discrimination they faced for their gender and skin color. Out of this study came an article titled "Positive Effects of the Multiple Negative: Explaining the Success of Black Professional Women", which the American Journal of Sociology published in 1973, explaining that employers were willing to hire African-American women because they could look good for hiring them but not have to hire both a woman and an African-American person.

Fuchs Epstein participated in various hearings on sexism as a scholar and activist, testifying at the Equal Employment Opportunity Commission where she spoke about Title VII of the Civil Rights Act and the barriers women faced in the professional world at the time. Fuchs Epstein was a consultant to the White House under two administrations as well as to the AT&T Corporation and General Motors. She also served at the National Academy of Sciences on the Committee of Women's Employment. She conducted research that focused on gender- and race-based segregation at AT&T. She served as an expert witness on the Citadel military school case where she argued women should be included in the school.

Fuchs Epstein's first book was published in 1971 and was titled Women's Place: Option and Limits on Professional Careers. In it, she focused on women's professional advancement as framed by the “opportunities offered them, the organizational limits placed on their ambitions, and the recognition and reward of their accomplishments.” Her work "made a crucial connection between traditional sociology and the emerging field of women's studies."

Her second book was published in 1981 and was titled Women in Law, focusing on the careers of female lawyers. Her book Deceptive Distinctions was published in 1988, focusing stereotypes and on how boundaries are socially constructed.

In the 1990s, the Association of the Bar of the City of New York's Committee on the Status of Women invited Fuchs Epstein to research why women's professional careers often ended mid-stream. She conducted a study on the professional mobility of women in several corporate law firms. From this research emerged a focus on the concept of the glass ceiling, and in 1993, Women in Law was reissued with a new section discussing the glass ceiling effect in the legal profession.

Fuchs Epstein was invited to meet with Hirsh Cohen, vice-president of the Alfred Sloan Foundation, in 1994. She conducted research that discovered that less than three percent of lawyers chose to work part-time, because this caused others to perceive them as less committed to their professional life and resulted in them not being given meaningful work. This research informed her next book, titled The Part-time Paradox: Time Norms, Professional Life, Family and Gender, published in 1999.

She published a paper in 2004 titled "Border Crossings: The Constraints of Time Norms in Transgressions of Gender and Professional Roles". It looks at the ways in which ideologies of time and gender restrict social change.

Fuchs Epstein has been Distinguished Professor Emerita of sociology at the City University of New York Graduate Center since 1990. She is a past president of the American Sociological Association (ASA). She has been a visiting scholar at the Russel Sage Foundation and Columbia Law School, visiting professor at the Stanford Center for Advanced Study in the Behavioral Sciences, and visiting fellow at the Stanford Law School. She was chair of the ASA Occupations and Organizations, Culture, and Sex and Gender Sections and 1984 president of the Eastern Sociological Society. She was also a 1976 Guggenheim Fellow.

== Awards ==
In 1982, Fuchs Epstein received the Merit Award from the American Bar Association and the Scribes Book Award for Women in Law. Fuchs Epstein has received are the 2004 Eastern Sociological Society Merit Award, the 2003 ASA Jessie Bernard Award, and the 1994 ASA Section on the Sociology of Sex and Gender's Distinguished Article Award.

== Selected publications ==
- The Part-time Paradox: Time Norms, Professional Life, Family and Gender. New York: Routledge, 1999. ISBN 978-0-415-92124-4
- Deceptive Distinctions: Sex, Gender, and the Social Order. New Haven: Yale University Press, 1990. ISBN 978-0-300-04694-6
- Women in Law. New York: Basic Books, 1980. ISBN 978-0-465-09205-5
- Women's Place: Options and Limits in Professional Careers. Berkeley: University of California Press, 1970. ISBN 978-0-520-01581-4
