= Jyoti Puri =

Feminist sociologist

Professor Jyoti Puri
- Born: India
- Awards: Jessie Bernard Award (2021); Distinguished Book Award, Sociology of Sexualities Section, American Sociological Association

Academic background
- Education: Ph.D. in Sociology and Social Anthropology, Northeastern University
- Alma mater: Northeastern University

Academic work
- Discipline: Sociology, Gender studies, Feminist theory
- Sub-discipline: Feminist sociology, Sexualities, Nationalism, Migration, Death and Dying
- Institutions: Simmons University
- Notable works: Woman, Body, Desire: Narratives of Gender and Sexuality in Post-colonial India (1999); Encountering Nationalism (2004); Sexual States: Governance and the Struggle Against the Antisodomy Law in India’s Present (2016)
- Website: Faculty page at Simmons University

Jyoti Puri is an American sociologist. She is Hazel Dick Leonard Chair and Professor of Sociology at Simmons University. She is a leading feminist sociologist who advocates for transnational and postcolonial approaches to the study of gender, sexuality, state, nationalism, and death and migration. She has published three books, and her most recent book, Sexual States: Governance and the Struggle Against the Antisodomy Law in India’s Present received the Distinguished Book Award from the Sociology of Sexualities Section of the American Sociological Association. She has delivered keynote lectures and given talks across a wide range of universities in North America and Europe.

== Career ==
Born and raised in India, Puri received a Ph.D. from the Department of Sociology and Social Anthropology at Northeastern University. At Simmons University, she has chaired the Sociology Department and co-directs the Master’s Program in Gender/Cultural Studies at Simmons University.

Her first book, cited over 300 times, Woman, Body, Desire: Narratives of Gender and Sexuality in Post-colonial India, focused on middle-class women in urban India about their experiences of gender and sexuality to show that the social control of women’s bodies occurs through the impact of nationalist and transnational discourses, rather than the family or kinship. A subsequent book, Encountering Nationalism, addresses the post-September 11, 2001 context and provides a feminist sociological introduction to the concepts of nationalism and states in relation to colonialism, race, gender, sexuality, and religion. The third book, Sexual States: Governance and the Struggle Against the Antisodomy Law in India’s Present, tracks the efforts to decriminalize homosexuality in India. She is currently working on death, funerals and migration to North America.

As a prominent feminist scholar of sexualities, states, and nations, Puri has co-edited two special issues for the journals, Rethinking Marxism and Gender & Society. She also published an essay on the Kama Sutra. She has been a co-editor for the journal Foucault Studies, deputy editor for Gender & Society, and is on the editorial board for SIGNS: Journal of Women in Culture and Society.

Puri is an active member of the American Sociological Association, has chaired its Section on Sex and Gender and served on committees. She was a founding member of the Caucus on Gender and Sexuality in International Contexts at the American Sociological Association. She was a co-host for the Feminisms Unbound speaker series and the Gender and Sexuality series at the Mahindra Humanities Center at Harvard University.

== Awards and honors ==
Puri received the prestigious Jessie Bernard Award in 2021. Established in 1977, the Jessie Bernard Award is given annually “in recognition of scholarly work inclusive of research, teaching, mentoring, and service, that has enlarged the horizons of sociology to encompass fully the role of women in society. It is presented for significant cumulative work done throughout a professional career that demonstrates broad scholarly impact.”

Puri was named one of only three endowed chairs at Simmons University. Her book, Sexual States: Governance and the Struggle Against the Antisodomy Law in India’s Present, received a Distinguished Book Award by the Sociology of Sexualities Section of the American Sociological Association.

Her research has been funded by Women’s Studies in Religion Program at the Harvard Divinity School, Rockefeller Foundation, and a Fulbright award.
