= Nona Glazer =

Nona Y. Glazer (born 1932) is a professor emerita of sociology and women's studies.

== Early life and education ==
Nona Glazer was born in 1932.

She graduated with a bachelor's degree and master's degree from the University of Oregon, and a PhD from Cornell University.

== Career ==
Glazer co-founded the women's studies program at Portland State University in 1971.

Her research interests are women and work. She defined the concept "work transfer" to describe the redistribution of responsibilities from paid workers to unpaid volunteers. She authored the book Women's Unpaid and Paid Labor, published in 1993 by Temple University Press. It examined women's paid and unpaid work in healthcare and retail, and work transfer in these industries which have shifted labor to women and families.

She served as President of Sociologists for Women in Society from 1976 to 1978, and from 1977 to 1978 was a chair of the sex and gender and the family sections of the American Sociological Association. She was a National Science Foundation fellow.

In 1997, Glazer was awarded the Jessie Bernard Award by the American Sociological Association in recognition of her career.
