= Risman =

Risman is a surname. Notable people with the surname include:

- Barbara Risman (born 1956), American sociologist
- Bev Risman (1937–2023), English rugby union and rugby league footballer
- Gus Risman (1911–1994), Welsh rugby league footballer
- John Risman (born 1944), President of Scotland Rugby League and professional rugby league footballer
- Matthew Risman, a fictional character in the Marvel Universe
