= Lisa Jean Moore =

American sociologist (born 1967)

Lisa Jean Moore (born January 2, 1967) is a distinguished professor of sociology and gender studies at the State University of New York at Purchase. A qualitative medical sociologist, Moore's scholarship examines the intersections of bodies, science, technology, gender, and human-animal relations through feminist and critical theoretical frameworks.

== Education ==
Moore has a BA from Tufts University, a Masters of Public Health from the University of California, Berkeley and a PhD from the University of California, San Francisco (1996).

== Career ==
Following her doctoral work, Moore was a fellow in the National Institute of Mental Health Traineeship in AIDS Prevention Sciences at the Center for AIDS Prevention Studies. Since 2015, Moore has taught sociology at the Bedford Hills Correctional Facility through the Marymount Manhattan College prison education program.

Moore's work combines ethnography, discourse analysis, and science and technology studies to examine how bodies — human and nonhuman — are made meaningful through scientific, cultural, and political practices. Her research addresses the biopolitics of reproduction, the cultural construction of bodily substances, and the relationships between humans and other species in contexts of genetic modification and environmental change.

Moore is co-founder and co-editor, with Monica Casper, of the NYU Press book series Biopolitics: Medicine, Technoscience, and Health in the 21st Century. The series publishes scholarly work examining the intersections of politics, bodies, medicine, and technology, and has included books by Thomas Lemke, Janet Shim, Carrie Friese, Joan Wolf and Cassandra Crawford.

From 1993 to 1998, Moore was board president for The Sperm Bank of California in Berkeley. She was on the board of the Center for Lesbian and Gay Studies at CUNY Graduate Center from 2000 to 2006.

Moore received the Chancellor's Award for Excellence in Scholarship and Creative Activities from the State University of New York in 2015. She was named SUNY Distinguished Professor in 2019.

== Books ==
- Our Transgenic Future: Spider Goats, Genetic Modification and the Will to Change Nature (New York University Press, 2022) examines goats engineered by US military and civilian scientists using spider DNA. The goats' milk contains spider silk protein fiber that can be spun into ultra-strong fabric for military body armor and biocompatible medical applications.
- Catch and Release: The Enduring yet Vulnerable Horseshoe Crab (NYU Press, 2018) explores how humans extract value from horseshoe crabs, while rendering them increasingly endangered.
- Buzz: Urban Beekeeping and the Power of the Bee (New York University Press, 2013), co-authored with Mary Kosut, is a study of urban beekeepers in New York City. The book examines how bees become meaningful to human life and how humans have created conditions of their necessity to bees' survival. It received the 2014 Distinguished Scholarship Award from the American Sociological Association's Animals and Society Section.
- Sperm Counts: Overcome by Man's Most Precious Fluid (New York University Press, 2007) analyzes cultural and biomedical representations of semen through historical documentation, semen banking promotional materials, children's sex education books, pornography, forensics transcripts, sex workers' narratives, and participant observation.
- Missing Bodies: The Politics of Visibility (New York University Press, 2009), co-authored with Monica J. Casper, examines six sites where some human bodies are hypervisible while others are rendered invisible, with consequences for social policy.
- With Judith Lorber, Moore has written Gendered Bodies: Feminist Perspectives (Oxford University Press, 2011), which offers feminist interpretation of bodies across the lifespan, abilities, racial and ethnic identities, ages, sexualities, and social classes; and Gender and the Social Construction of Illness (Altamira Press, 2002), analyzing power and politics in the interface between gender and Western medicine.
- With Monica J. Casper, Moore wrote The Body: Social and Cultural Dissections (Routledge, 2014), a textbook organized along anatomical lines that provides tools for social and cultural analysis.
- Moore and Mary Kosut edited The Body Reader: Essential Social and Cultural Readings (New York University Press, 2010), a collection about the sociology of the body.
