= TSBC =

TSBC is an abbreviation that may refer to:

- Tiffin School Boat Club, the rowing club of Tiffin School, Kingston upon Thames, England
- Transportation Safety Board of Canada
- The Sperm Bank of California
