= On Stage at World Cafe Live =

On Stage at World Cafe Live may refer to:

- On Stage at World Cafe Live, a DVD by Duncan Sheik
- On Stage at World Cafe Live, a DVD by Jennifer Glass and Danielia Cotton
- On Stage at World Cafe Live, a DVD by Joshua Redman
- On Stage at World Cafe Live, a DVD by Living Colour
- On Stage at World Cafe Live, a DVD by Marshall Crenshaw
- On Stage at World Cafe Live, a DVD by Naked Eyes
- On Stage at World Cafe Live, a DVD by Rhett Miller
- On Stage at World Cafe Live, a DVD by Rita Coolidge
- On Stage at World Cafe Live, a DVD by Shemekia Copeland
- On Stage at World Cafe Live, a DVD by Steve Forbert
- On Stage at World Cafe Live, a DVD by The Knack
