= Josephine Turpin Washington =

American teacher and writer (1861–1949)

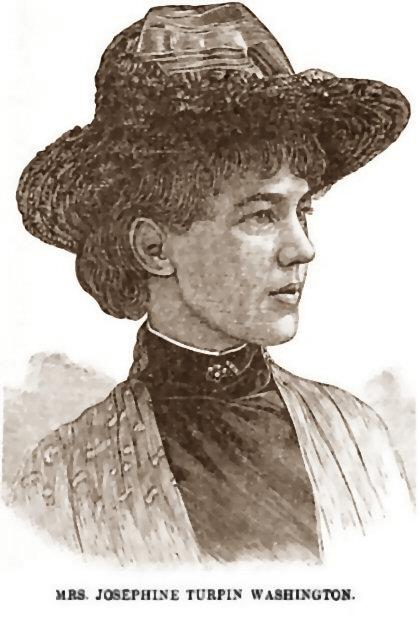
- Portrait published in The Afro-American Press and Its Editors, 1891
- Born: Josephine Turpin; July 31, 1861; Goochland County, Virginia
- Died: March 17, 1949 (aged 87); Cleveland, Ohio
- Occupation(s): Educator and writer
- Spouse: Dr. Samuel Somerville Hawkins Washington

Josephine Turpin Washington (July 31, 1861 – March 17, 1949) was an African-American writer and teacher. A long-time educator and a frequent contributor, Washington devised articles to magazines and newspapers typically concerning some aspect of racism in America. Washington was a great-granddaughter of Mary Jefferson Turpin, a paternal aunt of Thomas Jefferson.

== Family ==
Josephine Turpin was born in Goochland County, Virginia on July 31, 1861, the daughter of Augustus A. Turpin and Maria V. Crump. Her father was a son of a former African slave named Mary and her former enslaver Edwin Durock Turpin (1783–1868). In her 1995 book, All is Never Said: The Narrative of Odette Harper Hines (written with Judith Rollins), Hines reveals that Turpin fell in love with Mary not long after she arrived in Baton Rouge, Louisiana aboard a slave ship and became his property. Sometime later he took the very unusual step for the day and married her. According to Hines, her great-grandfather took care that their children received an education and also broke with common practice in allowing his slaves to learn basic reading, writing and arithmetic.

== Early life ==
Turpin was first educated at home and later at public schools probably in Goochland, Virginia. After her family relocated to Richmond, Virginia she attended the Richmond Institute, later known as the Richmond Theological Seminary. She was among the 1886 graduating class at Howard University where during summer breaks she clerked for Frederick Douglass, then recorder of deeds for the District of Columbia. After her graduation she taught mathematics at Howard University until her marriage in 1888 to Dr. Samuel Somerville Hawkins Washington brought her to Birmingham, Alabama.

== Educator ==
Over her career Washington would serve on the faculties of Selma University, Tuskegee Institute, where her husband held the position of school physician, Alabama State University and Wilberforce University. She retired in 1934 after twenty years as dean of women at Wilberforce.

== Writer ==
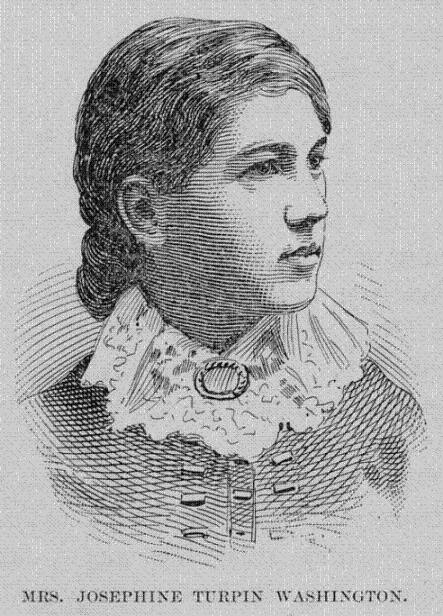
Josephine Turpin Washington New York Public Library

Washington's first article accepted for print, "A Talk about Church Fairs", appeared in the Virginia Star whilst she was still in her teens. In the piece she questioned the sale of wine at church fundraising events. Washington wrote essays such as "Higher Education for Women", which appeared in the People's Advocate, and the introductions to Women of Distinction (1893) by Lawson A. Scruggs and Homespun Heroines and Other Women of Distinction (1926) by Hallie Quinn Brown. She covered the gauntlet of issues concerning African-Americans, including employment and educational opportunities, the raising of children, and the challenges that threatens the bond between women and men. Washington defended the "progressive woman" who yearned for both a successful professional career and domestic life. As chair of the Executive Board of the Alabama State Federation of Colored Women's Clubs, Washington penned their Federation Hymn, Mother Alabama. She submitted numerous articles over her life for print in such publications as the Christian Recorder, the New York Freeman, the A. M. E. Review, The Colored American Magazine, and the New York Globe.

Writing in 1904 for the Colored American Magazine on the sixth annual meeting of the State Federation of Colored Women's Clubs, held in Mobile, Alabama, Washington reported not only on the delegate's focus on black womanhood, standards of morality, and the setting up of a youth reformatory but also on the pervasive effects of segregation and racial prejudice within the city itself. With an eye to discrimination on all levels of society, Washington noted, for instance, the playgrounds that were set aside for the exclusive use of white children, while black children "look on longingly, but dare not touch the sacred structure.

— Facts on File History Database Center

These and other articles are gathered in Rita Dandridge's edition of The Collected Essays of Josephine J. Turpin Washington: A Black Reformer in the Post-Reconstruction South (University of Virginia Press, 2019).

== Death ==
Washington died at age 87 at her daughter's home in Cleveland, Ohio.
