= Bonnie Thornton Dill =

Bonnie Thornton Dill (born 1944) is a feminist scholar and Dean of the College of Arts and Humanities at the University of Maryland, College Park. Born in Chicago, Dill attended the University of Chicago Laboratory School, which she credits with inspiring her approach to leadership and research.

== Career ==
Dill received her B.A. from the University of Rochester in 1965. She graduated from New York University, where she received her M.A (1970) and Ph.D. (1979). After graduating from New York University, Dill worked at the Office of Economic Opportunity, giving her the opportunity to learn about the importance of social class in the midst of the Civil Rights Movement. Dill is the first woman to be dean of the College of Arts and Humanities at the University of Maryland, College Park. She was also the founding director for both the Center for Research on Women at the University of Memphis and the Consortium on Race, Gender, and Ethnicity at the University of Maryland. She chaired the Department of Women's Studies at the University of Maryland, College Park for eight years before accepting the position of Dean.

Dill was president of the National Women's Studies Association (2010–2012) and vice president of the American Sociological Association (2007). She is a board member of the Feminist Majority Foundation, as well as chair of the advisory board of Scholars for Ms. Magazine. She also serves on the advisory board of the feminist academic journal Signs.

== Awards and honors ==
Dill has won a number of awards, including the Jessie Bernard Award and the Distinguished Contributions to Teaching Award both given by the American Sociological Association; and the Eastern Sociological Society's Robin Williams Jr. Distinguished Lectureship. In 2009–2010, she was appointed Stanley Kelley Jr. Visiting Professor for Distinguished Teaching in the Department of Sociology at Princeton University.
