= Joan Huber =

American sociologist (1925–2026)

- Born: October 17, 1925; Bluffton, Ohio, U.S.
- Died: February 22, 2026 (aged 100); Upper Arlington, Ohio, U.S.
- Education: B.A. Pennsylvania State University M.A. Western Michigan University Ph.D. Michigan State University
- Known for: Work on gender stratification
- Spouse(s): Tony Rytina, William Form
- Children: Nancy Rytina, Steve Rytina
- Awards: Jessie Bernard Award from the American Sociological Association
- Scientific career
- Fields: Sociology
- Workplaces: Ohio State University Pennsylvania State University University of Notre Dame University of Illinois Sociologists for Women in Society Midwest Sociological Society American Sociological Association
- Thesis: The ideology of American stratification (1967)

Joan Huber (October 17, 1925 – February 22, 2026) was an American sociologist and professor of sociology at Ohio State University. Huber served as the 79th president of the American Sociological Association in 1989. Huber taught at the University of Notre Dame from 1967 to 1971, eventually moving to Illinois, where she taught at the University of Illinois at Urbana/Champaign. While instructing numerous sociology courses at the University of Illinois at Urbana/Champaign, Huber served as the director of Women's Studies Program for two years (1978–1980), and then became the head of the Department of Sociology in 1979 until 1983. In 1984, Huber left Illinois for an opportunity at the Ohio State University, where she became the dean of the College of Social and Behavioral Sciences, coordinating dean of the Colleges of the Arts and Sciences, and senior vice president for academic affairs and university provost. During her time, Huber was president of Sociologists for Women in Society from 1972 to 1974, the Midwest Sociological Society from 1979 to 1980, and the American Sociological Association from 1988 to 1989. Being highly recognized for her excellence, in 1985 Huber was given the Jessie Bernard Award by the American Sociological Association. Not only was Huber an instructor of sociology at multiple institutions or president of different organizations, she also served different editorial review boards, research committees, and counseled and directed many institutions on their sociology departments.

== Life ==
=== Early life ===
Huber was born on October 17, 1925, in Bluffton, Ohio, to her mother, Hallie Althaus, and her father, Lawrence Huber, an entomologist. As a child, Huber lived in Wooster, Ohio, where her father worked at the Agricultural Experiment Station. Her scholarly influences were her father's education (Ph.D.) and The College of Wooster, a liberal arts college, located in the town. Huber graduated from Wooster High School in 1941.

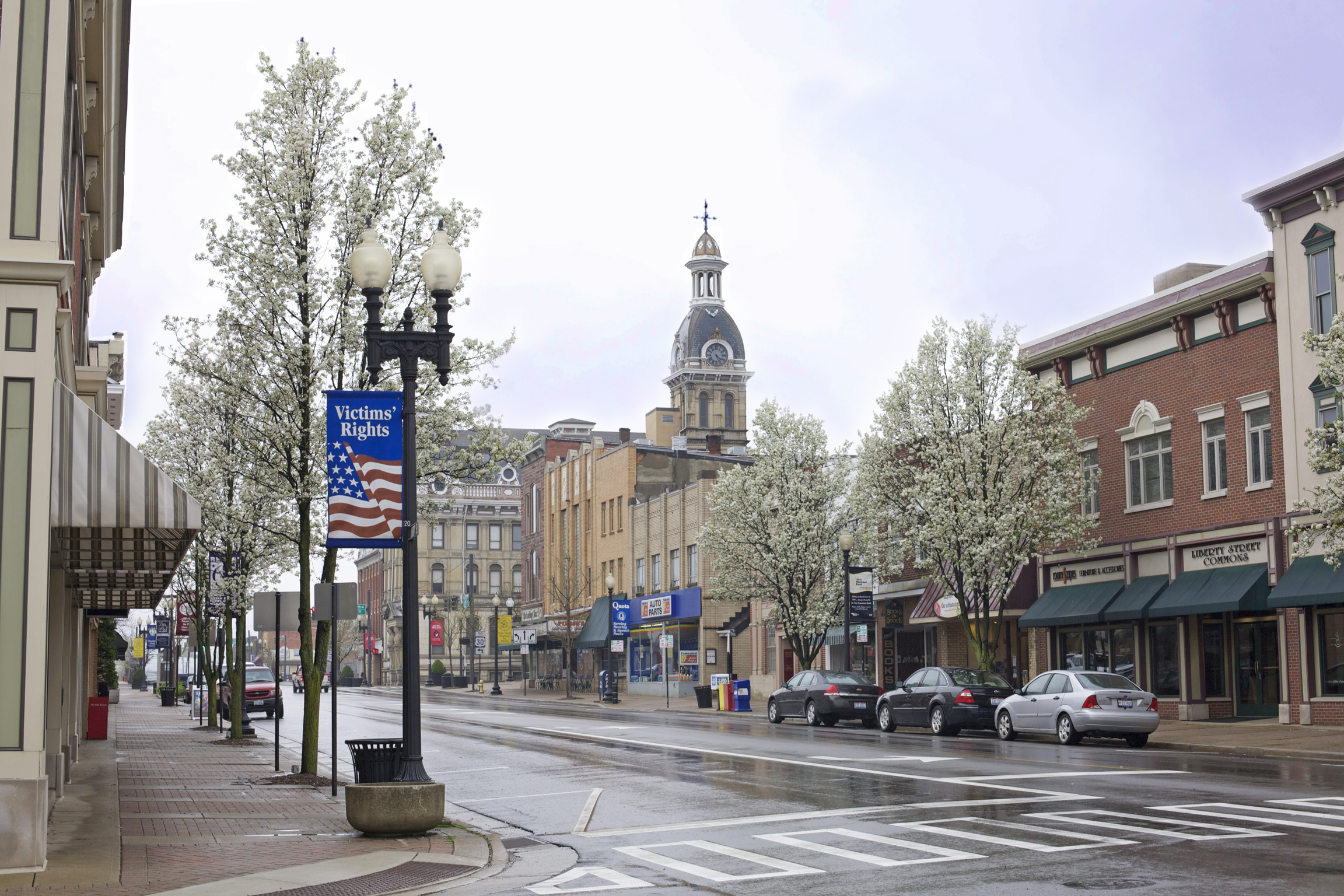
Hometown

=== Family ===
Daughter of Hallie Althaus and Lawrence Huber, Joan's father was an entomologist and studied insects in Wooster, Ohio. Lawrence Huber worked at the Agricultural Experiment Station, which is now known as the College of Food, Agricultural, and Environmental Sciences (CFAFES). Joan's father also received his doctorate degree. Huber first married around 1945 to Tony Rytina, after she graduated from Penn State. In her first marriage she had two children, Nancy and Steve. Huber met her second husband in 1971 and both accepted jobs at the University of Illinois.

=== Education ===
In 1945, Huber graduated from the Pennsylvania State University, where she earned and completed her bachelor's degree in German in less than two years. Following her graduation at the Pennsylvania State University, Huber then attended Western Michigan University, pursuing a master's degree. Ultimately receiving a master's in sociology in 1963, Huber then went on and furthered her education at Michigan State University and in 1967 she graduated and received her Ph.D.

=== Career ===
Huber's work focused around gender stratification, which looks at the uneven dispersal of wealth, power, and privilege between the sexes and the absence of women in the political sphere. Huber first taught at the University of Notre Dame from 1967 to 1971, eventually moving to the University of Illinois at Urbana/Champaign. While there, Huber served as the director of the Women's Studies Program for two years (1978–1980), becoming the head of the Department of Sociology in 1979 until 1983. In 1984, Huber moved to Ohio State University, where she became the dean of the College of Social and Behavioral Sciences, coordinating dean of the colleges of the Arts and Sciences, and senior vice president for academic affairs and university provost. Huber was president of Sociologists for Women in Society from 1972 to 1974, the Midwest Sociological Society from 1979 to 1980, and the American Sociological Association from 1988 to 1989. In 1985, Huber was given the Jessie Bernard Award by the American Sociological Association. Huber retired in 1993 after 48 years of research and education.

In 2007, Huber wrote On the Origins of Gender Inequality. In her book, Huber discusses asymmetrical gender inequality and how it has perpetuated men's domination of human societies and women's subordination. Finding that important biodata from studies of sex and gender stratification has been excluded from sociology, Huber argues that it is critical to acknowledge biological sex differences to comprehend the small role that women have played in activities of more power and prestige.

=== Death ===
Huber died on February 22, 2026, at the age of 100.

== Educational positions ==
- Pennsylvania State University (1945–1947), German department instructor
- University of Notre Dame (1967–1971), sociology
- University of Illinois at Urbana/Champaign (1971–1983), intro sociology, sociology of poverty, social stratification, introduction to women's studies program
- Ohio State University (1984–1992), dean of the College of Social and Behavioral Sciences
- Ohio State University (1986–1992), coordinating dean of the colleges of the arts and sciences
- Ohio State University (1992–1993), senior vice president for academic affairs and university provost

== Selected publications ==
- Joan Huber, On the Origins of Gender Inequality. New York: Routledge, 2007. ISBN 978-1-59451-362-6
- Joan Huber, "Macro-Micro Links in Gender Stratification: 1989 Presidential Address".
- Joan Huber, "A Theory of Family, Economics, and Gender".
