= Jessie Bernard =

American sociologist (1903–1996)

Jessie S. Bernard
- Born: June 8, 1903; Minneapolis, Minnesota, U.S.
- Died: October 6, 1996 (aged 93); Washington, D.C., U.S.
- Education: University of Minnesota (BA & MA in Sociology); Washington University in St. Louis (PhD in Sociology)
- Scientific career
- Fields: Sociology, feminist theory
- Workplaces: Lindenwood College (1940–1947); Penn State University (1947–1964)

Jessie Shirley Bernard (born Jessie Sarah Ravitch, 1903 – 1996) was an American sociologist and noted feminist scholar. She was a persistent forerunner of feminist thought in American sociology and her life's work is characterized as extraordinarily productive spanning several intellectual and political eras. Bernard studied and wrote about women's lives since the late 1930s and her contributions to social sciences and feminist theory regarding women, sex, marriage, and the interaction with the family and community are well noted. She has garnered numerous honors in her career and has several awards named after her, such as the Jessie Bernard Award. Jessie Bernard was a prolific writer, having published 15 sole-authored books, 9 co-authored books, over 75 journal articles, and over 40 book chapters. The final chapter of her book American Community Behavior is heavily based on Raphael Lemkin's work and is considered one of the earliest sociological studies of genocide.

== Early life ==
Jessie Bernard (born Jessie Sarah Ravitch) was born and raised in Minneapolis, Minnesota. She was the third of four children born to Jewish-Romanian parents, Bessie Kanter and David Soloman Ravitch. In the 1880s her parents immigrated separately to the United States from Transylvania (today in Romania). Bernard's father started out delivering dairy products in Minneapolis, later became a haberdasher and finally a real estate broker. At the time, the Ravitch family were the only Jewish-immigrant family to reside in a middle-class community. With regards to Bernard's education, her parents believed she was better off pursuing an education in business school. However, Bernard graduated from public high school in 1920 and left home to study in social sciences at the University of Minnesota.

== Education and career ==
=== University of Minnesota ===
Bernard completed her undergraduate and post-graduate studies at the University of Minnesota. She earned her BA (magna cum laude) in 1923 and her MA in sociology in 1924. Her MA thesis was titled "Changes of Attitudes of Jews in the First and Second Generation" that earned her the Harris Prize. During her studies here she became actively involved in attempts to establish sociology as a recognized profession within American academia and she actively participated in the injection of empirical research into meetings of the American Sociological Society. Bernard studied with Pitirim Sorokin (founder of the sociology department at Harvard) and became research assistant to her sociology professor, Luther Lee Bernard.

=== Washington University in St Louis ===
At Washington University in St. Louis, Bernard continued her research and later earned her PhD in sociology in 1935. Together, the Bernards challenged the dominance of the University of Chicago in the field of sociology that ultimately saw their involvement in the creation of the American Sociological Review.

=== Lindenwood College ===
Bernard took up a teaching position at Lindenwood College in 1940 where she remained teaching for the next seven years. Following the events of World War II, in particular the Nazi Holocaust, Bernard started to move away from the positivistic approach dominant in social science and became increasingly supportive of the social contextuality of all knowledge. This time would also mark her movement toward a feminist position in sociology as seen in the qualitative research and critical analysis prevalent in her later work.

=== Penn State University ===
In 1947, her husband negotiated positions as lecturers for Bernard and himself at Penn State University. Bernard managed to establish her own academic independence and became a Full Professor of sociology. She remained here for the larger part of her academic career. During her time as professor she became a founding member of the Society for the Study of Social Problems and helped legitimize feminist studies. She retired as Professor Emeritus from Penn State University at age 62.

=== Retirement ===
Although her retirement marked her movement out of academic life, Bernard devoted herself to writing and research on a full-time basis as well as remaining an active feminist in the women's movement for the next two decades. This would also be the period of her life that saw extraordinary productivity in terms of her research and writings. She published the majority of her books in this period as well as several articles and presentations, establishing herself as a leading contributor to professional and lay understandings of the sociology of gender. Her work was further marked by a critical rejection of sociology as a positivistic science to the extent where she rethought her early writings in light of a feminist position.

This period of Bernard's life would also see her as president of the Eastern Sociological Association, president and founding member of the Society for the Study of Social Problems, founding board member of the Center for Women Policy Studies as well as member of the boards of Urban Institute Women's Program and the Women's Equity Action League. During this time she was also a visiting professor at Princeton University. Bernard lectured at professional meetings and universities around the world and met women from all over the world in international women's meetings. In 1977, Bernard became an associate of the Women's Institute for Freedom of the Press (WIFP). WIFP is an American nonprofit publishing organization. The organization works to increase communication between women and connect the public with forms of women-based media.

== Research and writings ==
Bernard characterized her own work as a movement towards contemporary feminism or what she also referred to as "the feminist enlightenment". Since the mid-1940s, Jessie's focus was to increase understanding of the effects of sexism on women's experience of marriage, parenting, education and economic life. This ultimately formed the largest part of her contributions to sociology and feminist theory. To sum up her contribution to sociology in her own words:

"I am concerned, as any fair-minded person must be, with the effects of sexism on the position of women in our profession and in our society; but I am also concerned, as any dedicated sociologist must be, with its effects on our discipline as well. Important as are the costs to women of the male bias in sociology, on which a considerable literature exists, I am concerned here not with them but rather with the costs of this bias to the discipline itself. I am not, therefore asking what sociology can do for women - for example, by filling in the gaps in our knowledge about them, itself a significant contribution - but rather what women (and sympathetic male colleagues) can do for sociology." .

Bernard's research (statistical analysis of health and mortality data) published in The Paradox of the Happy Marriage (1971) and The Future of Marriage (1972) illustrated that marriage was good for men, but not for women. She argued that men and women live in different worlds and perceive of marriage differently. She attributed this to the gendered nature of social structures in society. Building on her previous work and research, Bernard later published The Female World (1981) and The Female World from a Global Perspective (1987). In "The Female World" (1981) she argued that although men and women move in geographically similar places, households, political and economic arenas, they actually live in different single-sex worlds. In "The Female World from a Global Perspective" (1987) she mapped differences among women in terms of life expectancy, nutrition, wealth, literacy, work and politics as well as how racism, classism, and imperialism divide their worlds.

== Honors and recognition ==
Bernard was awarded the title "Research Scholar Honoris Causa" by Pennsylvania State University in 1965. In 1976 the American Sociological Association established the Jessie Bernard Award for "work that has enlarged the horizons of the discipline of sociology to encompass fully the role of women in society" in Bernard's honor. In 1976, Bernard received the Achievement Award from the American Association of University Women. On her 85th birthday The Center for Women's Policy Studies honored Bernard by the creation of the Jessie Bernard Wise Women Award in recognition of "women leaders, activists and scholars whose lives and work demonstrate and advocacy of feminist enlightenment". She was honored by numerous associations and institutions of higher education in recognition of her work and contributions to sociology, feminist theory and the women's movement.

== Personal life ==
After working as research assistant to her sociology professor, Luther Lee Bernard for 4 years, she married him on September 23, 1925. Their union was considered controversial by some given that Luther was 23 years her senior and non-Jewish. The Bernards moved several times due to Luther's various appointments at academic institutions as a professor at Cornell University, Tulane University, and University of North Carolina before finally settling at Washington University in St. Louis in 1929. During her time at Washington University in St. Louis, Bernard struggled to obtain personal and professional independence and she separated from her husband in 1936 for a period of four years until the couple reconciled in 1940. Despite Luther's initial objections, they overcame their differences and started a family. Her start at Lindenwood College was marked by the birth of her first child, Dorothy Lee, in 1941 and the birth of her second child, Claude, in 1945. Bernard gave birth to their third child, David, in 1950 during her time at Penn State University. Unfortunately, Luther died of cancer the next year and Bernard had to raise their children as a single-parent. She died in 1996.

== Selected bibliography ==
=== Books ===
- Bernard, Jessie. 1942. "American Family Behavior". New York: Harper & Brothers.
- Bernard, Jessie. 1949. "American Community Behavior". New York: Dryden Press
- Bernard, Jessie. 1956. "Remarriage: A Study of Marriage". New York: Dryden Press.
- Bernard, Jessie. 1957. "Social Problems at Midcentury: Role, Status and Stress in a Context of Abundance". New York: Dryden Press,
- Bernard, Jessie. 1964. "Academic Women". University Park: Pennsylvania State University Press.
- Bernard, Jessie. 1966. "Marriage and Family Among Negroes". New Jersey: Prentice-Hall.
- Bernard, Jessie. 1968. "The Sex Game". New Jersey: Prentice-Hall.
- Bernard, Jessie. 1971. "Women and the Public Interest: An Essay on Policy and Protest". Chicago: Aldine.
- Bernard, Jessie. 1972. "The Future of Marriage". New York Bantam Books.
- Bernard, Jessie. 1973. "The Sociology of Community". Glenview Illinois: Scott, Foresman Publisher.
- Bernard, Jessie. 1975. "The Future of Motherhood". New York: Penguin Books.
- Bernard, Jessie. 1975. "Women, Wives, Mothers: Values and Options". Chicago: Aldine.
- Bernard, Jessie. 1978. "Self-Portrait of a Family". Boston: Beacon Press.
- Bernard, Jessie. 1981. "The Female World". New York: Free Press.
- Bernard, Jessie. 1987. "The Female World from a Global Perspective". Indiana: Indiana University Press.

=== Co-authored books ===
- Luther, Lee Bernard and Bernard, Jessie. 1934. "Sociology and the Study of International Relations". St. Louis: Washington University Studies.
- Bernard, Luther Lee and Bernard, Jessie. 1943. "Origins of American Sociology". New York: Thomas Y. Crowell Company.
- Bernard, Jessie, Smith, William M. and Buchanan, Helen E. 1958. "Dating, Mating, and Marriage". Cleveland, Ohio: Howard Allen, Inc.
- Bernard, Jessie and MacLurg Jensen, Deborach. 1962. "Sociology". St. Louis: C.V. Mosby Co.
- Broderick, Calfred B. and Bernard, Jessie. 1969. "The Individual, Sex and Society". Baltimore: Johns Hopkins.
- Bernard, Jessie, Thompson, Lida F. and MacLurg Jensen, Deborah. 1970. "Sociology: Nurses and their Patients in a Modern Society". St. Louis: C.V. Mosby Co.

=== Chapters in books ===
- Bernard, Jessie. "The History and Prospects of Sociology in the United States." In Trends in American Sociology. edited by George A. Lundberg, Read Bain, and Nels Anderson. New York: Harper and Bros., 1929.
- Bernard, Jessie. "The Sources and Methods of Social Psychology." The Fields and Methods of Sociology, ed. Luther L. Bernard. New York: R. Long and R.R. Smith, Inc., 1934.
- Bernard, Jessie. "Biculturality: A Study in Social Schizophrenia". In Jews in a Gentile World, eds. Isacque Graeber and Steuart H. Britt. New York: Macmillan, 1942.
- Bernard, Jessie. "An Analysis of Jewish Culture." In Jews in a Gentile World, eds. Isacque Graeber and Steuart H. Britt. New York: Macmillan, 1942
- Bernard, Jessie. "Social Work." In Contemporary Social Science, eds. Philip L. Harriman. Harrisburg: Stackpole Co., 1953.
- Bernard, Jessie. "The Sociological Study of Conflict." In The Nature of Conflict ed. International Sociological Association. Belgium: UNESCO, 1957.
- Bernard, Jessie. "The United States." In The Institutions of Advanced Societies, ed. Arnold M. Rose. Minneapolis: University of Minnesota Press, 1958.
- Bernard, Jessie. "Divorce and Remarriage." In Sex Ways in Fact and Faith, eds. Evelyn and Sylvanus Duvall. New York: Association Press, 1961.
- Bernard, Jessie. "The Adjustments of Married Mates." In Handbook of Marriage and the Family, ed. Harold T. Christensen. Chicago: Rand McNally and Co., 1964.
- Bernard, Jessie. "The Present Situation in the Academic World of Women Trained in Engineering." In Women in the Scientific Professions, ed. Jacquelyn A.Mattfeld. Cambridge: MIT Press, 1965.
- Bernard, Jessie. "Conflict as Research and Research as Conflict." In The Rise and Fall of Project Camelot, ed. Irving L. Horowitz. Cambridge: MIT Press, 1967.
- Bernard, Jessie. Present Demographic Trends and Structural Outcomes in Family Life Today." In Marriage and Family Counseling, ed. James A. Peterson. New York: Association Press, 1968.
- Bernard, Jessie. "The Eudaemonists." In Why Men Take Chances ed. Samuel Z. Klausner. New York: Doubleday and Co., 1968.
- Bernard, Jessie. "Counseling, Psychotherapy and Social Problems in Value Contexts." In Explorations in Sociology and Counseling, ed. Donald A. Hansen. Boston: Houghton, Mifflin, 1969.
- Bernard, Jessie. "Functions and Limitations in Counseling and Psychotherapy." In Explorations in Sociology and Counseling, ed. Donald A. Hansen. Boston; Houghton, Mifflin Co., 1969.
- Bernard, Jessie. "Infidelity: Some Moral and Social Issues." In The Dynamics of Work and Marriage, ed. Jules H. Masserman. New York: Grune and Straton, 1970.
- Bernard, Jessie. "No News, but New Ideas." In Divorce and After, ed. Paul Bohannan. New York: Doubleday and Co., 1970.
- Bernard, Jessie. "The Paradox of a Happy Marriage." In Women in Sexist Society, eds. Vivian Gornick and Barbara K. Moran. New York: Basic Books, 1971.
- Bernard, Jessie. "Sex as a Regenerative Force." In The New Sexuality, ed. Herbert A. Otto Palo Alto. California: Science and Behavior Books, 1971.
- Bernard, Jessie. "The Housewife: Between Two Worlds." In Work, eds. Phyllis Stewart and Muriel Canter. Chicago: Markham, 1972.
- Bernard, Jessie. "Women, Marriage, and the Future." In Toward a Sociology of Women, ed. Constantina Safilios-Rothschild. Lexington: Xerox College Pub., 1972.
- Bernard, Jessie. "Adolescence and Socialization for Motherhood." In Adolescence in the Life Cycle, Psychological Change and Social Context, ed. Sidney E. Dragastin and Glen H. Elder Jr. Washington: Hemisphere Publishing Co., 1975.
- Bernard, Jessie. "Jealousy and Marriage." in Jealousy, eds. Gordon Clanton and Lynn G. Smith. New Jersey: Prentice-Hall, Inc., 1977.
- Bernard, Jessie. "'Contingency' or 'Career' Schedules for Women." In Increasing Student Development Options in College, ed. David E. Drew. San Francisco: Jossey-Bass, 1978.
- Bernard, Jessie. "Models for the Relationship between the World of Women and the World of Men." In Research in Social Movements, ed. Louis Kriesberg. Greenwich: JAI Publishing, 1978.
- Bernard, Jessie. "Policy and Women's Time." In Sex Roles and Social Policy, eds. Jean Lipman-Blumen and Jessie Bernard. Beverly Hills: Sage Publications 1979.
- Bernard, Jessie. "Update on Women." In The Future American College, ed. Arthur W. Chicering. New Jersey: Prentice Hall, 1980.
- Bernard, Jessie. "The Housewife." In Varieties of Work, ed. Phyllis Stewart and Muriel Cantor. Beverly Hills: Sage Publications, 1982.
- Bernard, Jessie. "Benchmark for the '80s." In Handbook for Women Scholars, ed. Monika Kehoe. San Francisco: Center for Women Scholars, 1983.
- Bernard, Jessie. "Reflections on Style, Structure, and Subject." In Scholarly Writing and Publishing, ed. Mary Frank Fox. Colorado: Westview, 1985.

=== Articles ===
(See external link below for a complete bibliography of Jessie Bernard's 75-plus journal articles)
