= Muriel Cantor =

American sociologist and media scholar

Muriel Goldsman Cantor (March 2, 1923 – July 19, 1995) was an American sociologist and media scholar. She founded and directed the women's studies program at American University (AU).

== Life ==
Muriel Goldsman was born on March 2, 1923, in Minneapolis. She graduated from the University of California at Los Angeles, where she also gained her PhD. She married Joel M. Cantor (died 1988), who worked as a government psychologist.

Cantor lectured at Immaculate Heart College in Los Angeles before joining American University in 1968. She chaired the department of sociology there in the 1970s. In 1989 she founded the AU gender studies program, and directed it until her retirement in 1993.

At the time of her death Cantor had been elected president of Sociologists for Women in Society (SWS).

She died of cardiac arrest at Georgetown University Hospital on July 19, 1995.

== Works ==
- The Hollywood TV Producer: His Work and His Audience. New York: Basic Books, 1971.
- Prime Time Television: Content and Control. 1980. Second edition, 1992, with Joel M. Cantor.
- (ed. with Phyllis Stewart) Varieties of Work. Beverly Hills: Sage Publications, 1982.
- (with Suzanne Pingree) The Soap Opera. SAGE Publications, 1983.
- (ed. with Sandra Ball-Rokeach) Media, Audience and Social Structure. SAGE, 1986.
