= Elizabeth Higginbotham =

Sociologist

Elizabeth Higginbotham is a sociologist of race, gender and class. She received her undergraduate degree from City College of New York and her doctorate from Brandeis University. In 1980 Higginbotham received a Ford Foundation postdoctoral fellowship. She first came to notice as one of the founding members of the Center for Research on Women at the University of Memphis. After a career that included stints at Columbia University and the University of Memphis, she is now professor of social policy and justice and faculty scholar emerita of the Center for Diversity at the University of Delaware.

Higginbotham is best known for her pioneering study, Too Much To Ask: Black Women in the Era of Integration, and the co-authored, with Margaret L. Andersen, Race and Ethnicity in Society: The Changing Landscape. In 1993, Higginbotham received the Jessie Bernard Award from the American Sociological Association.
