= Judith Rollins =

Academic

- Awards: Jessie Bernard Award; 1987

Academic background
- Education: Howard University (BA, MA); Brandeis University (PhD)

Academic work
- Discipline: Sociologist
- Sub-discipline: Sociology of gender; Sociology of race and ethnic relations; Sociology of class
- Institutions: Wellesley College
- Notable works: Between Women: Domestics and Their Employers

Judith Rollins is a Professor Emeritus of Africana Studies and Sociology at Wellesley College.

Rollins earned her Bachelor of Arts and Master of Arts degrees from Howard University, and her PhD in Sociology from Brandeis University.

Her research interests are in gender, race and class. She has previously taught at Simmons College, Boston College and the University of the District of Columbia.

In 1987, she was awarded the Jessie Bernard Award by the American Sociological Association for her book Between Women: Domestics and Their Employers, an award which recognises a work of exceptional contribution to women's studies. The book was a participant observation study in which Rollins studied the relationships between black women domestic workers and their white employers, and revealed insights into domination, deferential behaviours and power dynamics of gender, ethnicity and class.

From 2008 to 2009, Rollins was president of the Association of Black Sociologists. In March 2014, Rollins was featured as 'author of the month' by Nevis Public Library in Saint Kitts and Nevis.

== Selected publications ==
- Between Women: Domestics and Their Employers (1985)
- All is Never Said: The Narrative of Odette Harper Hines (1995)
- Voices of Concern: Nevisian Women's Issues at the Turn of the 21st Century (2010)
