= Rhacel Parreñas =

Filipino sociologist

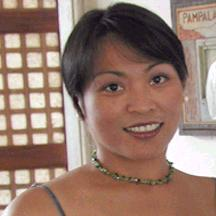
- Rhacel Parreñas, 2002
- Born: February 13, 1971 (age 55); Manila, Philippines
- Occupation: Professor

Rhacel Salazar Parreñas (born February 13, 1971) is Doris Stevens Professor of Sociology and Gender and Sexuality Studies at Princeton University. She previously taught at the University of Southern California, Brown University, the University of California, Davis and the University of Wisconsin–Madison.

== Career ==
Parreñas received her Bachelor of Arts in Peace and Conflict Studies from University of California, Berkeley in 1992. She finished a Ph.D. in comparative ethnic studies with a designated emphasis in women, gender and sexuality from UC Berkeley in 1998 . Parreñas works on issues such as gender, migration, and globalization, particularly the international division of reproductive labor, also known as the care chain. Her work has inspired books and studies, including reports released by the United Nations. The idea of the care chain also inspired the production of the documentary The Care Chain by VPRO-TV in the Netherlands.

== Life ==
Parreñas migrated to the United States in 1983, as a daughter of political refugees.

== Books ==
- Servants of globalization : migration and domestic work (Second ed.). Stanford University Press. 2015. ISBN 978-0-8047-9618-7. OCLC 913955421.
- Illicit Flirtations: Labor, Migration and Sex Trafficking in Tokyo. Stanford University Press. January 31, 2011. ISBN 9780804777124.
- The Force of Domesticity: Filipina Migrants and Globalization. NYU Press. January 31, 2008. ISBN 9780804777124.
- Children of Global Migration: Transnational Families and Gendered Woes. Stanford University Press. January 31, 2005. ISBN 9780804749459.
- Servants of Globalization: Migration and Domestic Work. Stanford University Press. January 31, 2001. ISBN 9780804739221.

== Interviews ==
- 2008 “In transnational households traditional notions of mothering and fathering are reinforced”, Interview with Rhacel Parreñas on transnational families and the gendered division of reproductive labour. In: genderstudies 13 (2008). p. 6‐7.
- Legerski, Elizabeth Miklya (2007-01-01). "Interview with Rhacel Salazar Parreñas". Social Thought and Research. doi:10.17161/STR.1808.5220. hdl:1808/5220. ISSN 1094-5830.

== Awards ==
She has received research funding from the Ford Foundation, Rockefeller Foundation, and National Science Foundation. She was given the honors of the Edith Kreeger Wolf Distinguished Visiting Professor from Northwestern University in 2010 and the Distinguished Research Professor of Gender Studies from Ochanomizu University for the 2005–2006 academic year. For Illicit Flirtations, she received the 2012 Distinguished Scholarly Publication Award, sponsored by the American Sociological Association Labor and Labor Movements Section. In 2003, Parreñas received an honorable mention in the Social Science Book Prize Category from the Association for Asian American Studies for Servants of Globalization. In 2019, Parrenas received the Jessie Bernard Award.
