= Marlese Durr =

American sociologist

Marlese Durr is an American sociologist and professor in the department of Sociology and Anthropology at Wright State University in Dayton, Ohio.

== Education ==
Durr received her B.S. from the University of Detroit and University of Albany (1978) and completed her M.A. in African American Studies (1979) and Sociology (1985) from the University of Albany. Later completed her PhD in sociology (1993) from the University of Albany.

== Career ==
After receiving her PhD, Durr served as an Assistant Professor in the department of Sociology and Anthropology from 1994 to 2000) at Wright State University, then as an Associate Professor from 2000 to 2007) and as a professor since 2007.

Durr was president of the Society for the Study of Social Problems in 2014–2015 and president of Sociologists for Women in Society in 2004–2005.

== Recognition ==
In 2022 Durr was awarded the Jessie Bernard Award from the American Sociological Association for her scholarly work that is awarded to an individual who has expanded the horizons of sociologist to fully encompass the role of women is society. That same year Durr was also awarded the SWS Distinguished Feminist Lecture Award from the Sociologists for Women in Society for employing a feminist perspective.

== Books ==
Durr's books include:

- The New Politics of Race: From Du Bois to the 21st Century (edited, Praeger, 2002)
- Race, Work, and Family in the Lives of African Americans (edited with Shirley A. Hill, Rowman and Littlefield, 2006)
