= Barbara Risman =

American sociologist

- Born: 20 July 1956 (age 70); Lynn, Massachusetts, U.S.
- Education: University of Washington
- Scientific career
- Fields: Gender inequality
- Workplaces: University of Illinois at Chicago
- Website: www.barbararisman.com/bio.html

Barbara J. Risman is professor and head of sociology at the University of Illinois at Chicago.

== Early life and education ==
Risman was born on July 20, 1956, in Lynn, Massachusetts to an immigrant Jewish family. Risman's grandparents fled antisemitism in Europe and immigrated to the United States in the early 20th century. She grew up in a multi-generational extended family home with grandparents, aunts, and cousins as well as her parents and three siblings. An early experience of sexual discrimination occurred at her bat mitzvah in 1968. At that time, only boys were permitted to read from the Torah. Risman has been interested in gender inequality ever since that first “click.” She earned her bachelor's degree in sociology and women's studies from Northwestern University in 1976, and her Ph.D. in sociology from the University of Washington in 1983.

== Academic career ==
Risman joined the Department of Sociology at North Carolina State University (NCSU) in 1984. She was also the founding director of the NCSU Women's Studies program from 1989 to 1993. In 2006, she became professor and Head of the Department of Sociology at the University of Illinois at Chicago. She has been a visiting professor at the University of Pennsylvania, the University of Trento in Italy, and the Free University in Amsterdam. Professor Risman was elected as vice-president of the American Sociological Association. From January - March 2018 she was a Fellow of the Institute of Advanced Study based at Durham University, and affiliated with St Mary's College.

== Organizations ==
Currently, she is president of the board of the Council of Contemporary Families, a non-profit, non-partisan organization of family scholars and practitioners dedicated to providing the press and public with the latest research and best-practice findings about families. She has also served as co-chair and executive director of the Council on Contemporary Families, president of Sociologists for Women in Society, and a member of the Executive Council of the American Sociological Association. She was the president (2015–2016) of the Southern Sociological Society.

== Gender as a social structure ==
A major career contribution is Risman's theory of gender as a social structure. Her book, Gender Vertigo: American Families in Transition (1998, Yale University Press) is an early presentation of this theory. In this monograph, Risman introduces a theoretical framework that conceptualizes gender as a social structure, comprising three distinct but interlocking levels – individual, interactional, and institutional. Risman argues that it is the recursive relationship between all three levels that constructs and perpetuates gender inequalities in society. The monograph includes research on single fathers as parents, how baby boom women balance work and family, and egalitarian couples.

In her forthcoming book, Risman traces the history of ideas and development of the use of gender in sociological theory and analysis. She then offers her own feminist theory of gender as a social structure. This is a major revision of her argument about how social change towards gender equality might effectively occur with far more attention to cultural issues. The book provides elaboration of how gender is constructed and sometimes deconstructed at the individual, interactional and institutional levels. She illustrates the use of efficacy of her theoretical argument with three different research studies: The first study is based on life history interviews with young people ages 18 and 30 about the meaning of gender in their lives. The second study is based on a major national survey of college students, as well as nearly 100 interviews with University of Illinois at Chicago (UIC) students about sexuality. The third study is an analysis of the effectiveness of major federal grants to universities to do "gender transformation" projects; the data are based on a meta-analysis of new research and an analysis of both quantitative climate surveys and interviews with people involved in the project at the UIC. The book concludes with a utopian vision for a society that has moved beyond gender.

== Influence on gender studies ==
Numerous studies have drawn on Risman's theoretical framework of gender as a social structure. These include, but are not limited to, analyses of double standards in hooking up, men's talk about home cooking, involvement in gay and lesbian rights activism, sexual violence on college campuses, the “ex-gay” movement, gendered migration, the division of housework and child care, and how society can move toward greater gender equality.

== Awards ==
Risman's numerous awards include the Sociologists for Women in Society (SWS) Feminist Lecturer Award in 2003, the Southern Sociological Society Katherine Belle-Boone Jocher Award for lifetime contributions to the study of gender in 2005, the SWS Feminist Mentoring Award in 2007, and the American Sociological Association Award for the Public Understanding of Sociology in 2011. Most recently, she was named among the "100 Women that Mattered" at North Carolina State University.

== Selected bibliography ==
=== Books ===
- Risman, Barbara J.; Schwartz, Pepper (1989). Gender in intimate relationships: a microstructural approach. Belmont, Calif: Wadsworth Pub. Co. ISBN 9780534096908.
- Risman, Barbara J.; Myers, Kristen A.; Anderson, Cynthia D. (1998). Feminist foundations: toward transforming sociology. Thousand Oaks, CA: Sage Publications. ISBN 9780761907862.
- Risman, Barbara J. (1998). Gender vertigo: American families in transition. New Haven, Conn: Yale University Press. ISBN 9780300072150.
- Risman, Barbara J. (2010). Families as they really are (1st ed.). New York: W.W. Norton. ISBN 9780393932782. Second edition forthcoming in 2014.

=== Journal articles ===
- Risman, Barbara J. (January 1986). "Can men "mother"? Life as a single father". Family Relations. 35 (1): 95–102. doi:10.2307/584288. JSTOR 584288.
- Risman, Barbara J. (March 1987). "Intimate relationships from a microstructural perspective: men who mother". Gender and Society. 1 (1): 6–32. doi:10.1177/089124387001001002. S2CID 145193284.
- Risman, Barbara J.; Park, Kyung (November 1988). "Just the two of us: parent-child relationships in single-parent homes". Journal of Marriage and Family. 50 (4): 1049–1062. doi:10.2307/352114. JSTOR 352114.
- Risman, Barbara J.; Myers, Kristen (June 1997). "As the twig is bent: children reared in feminist households". Qualitative Sociology. 20 (2): 229–252. doi:10.1023/A:1024713702365. S2CID 142811444.
- Risman, Barbara J.; Johnson-Sumerford, Danette (February 1998). "Doing it fairly: a study of postgender marriages". Journal of Marriage and Family. 60 (1): 23–40. doi:10.2307/353439. JSTOR 353439.
- Risman, Barbara J.; Atkinson, Maxine P.; Blackwelder, Stephen P. (June 1999). "Understanding the juggling act: Gendered preferences and social structural constraints". Sociological Forum. 14 (2): 319–344. doi:10.1023/A:1021422930020. S2CID 141356631.
- Risman, Barbara J.; Sperling, Valerie; Ferree, Myra Marx (Summer 2001). "Constructing global feminism: transnational advocacy networks and Russian women's activism". Signs: Journal of Women in Culture and Society. 26 (4): 1155–1186. doi:10.1086/495651. JSTOR 3175360. PMID 17605197. S2CID 33125608.
- Risman, Barbara J. (August 2004). "Gender as a social structure: theory wrestling with activism". Gender & Society. 18 (4): 429–450. doi:10.1177/0891243204265349. S2CID 27977565.
- Risman, Barbara J. (February 2009). "From doing to undoing: gender as we know it". Gender & Society. 23 (1): 81–84. doi:10.1177/0891243208326874. S2CID 144997602.
