= Patricia Yancey Martin =

American sociologist and academic

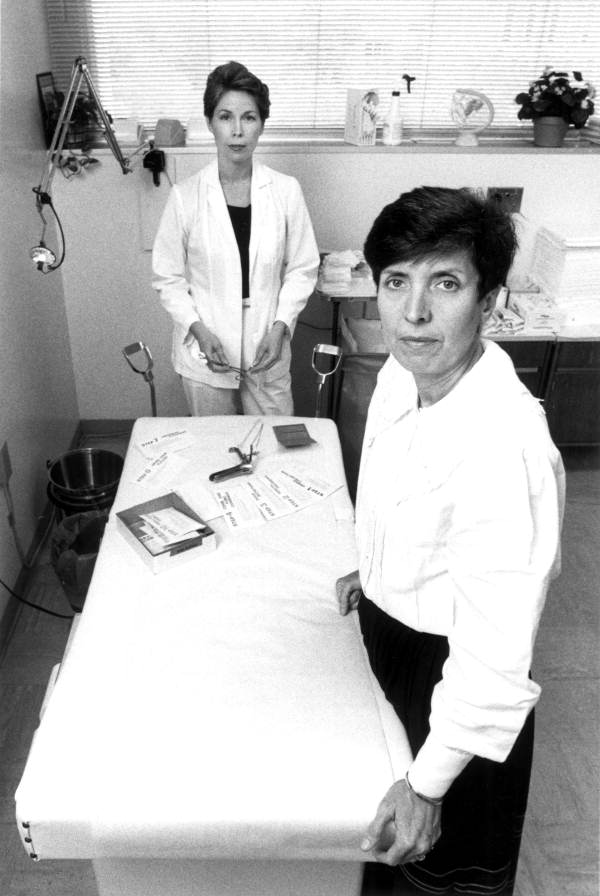
- Martin (right) in 1987
- Citizenship: United States
- Occupation: Sociologist
- Title: Daisy Parker Flory Professor Emerita of Sociology, Florida State University
- Awards: Jessie Bernard Award

Academic background
- Education: Florida State University
- Thesis: Choice among professions: a comparative study of medicine, law, and college teaching
- Doctoral advisor: Charles M. Grigg

Patricia Yancey Martin is an American sociologist. She is the Daisy Parker Flory Professor of Sociology Emerita at Florida State University.

== Education ==
Martin was inducted into Alpha Lambda Delta her freshman year at University of Alabama in 1959. She earned a Bachelor of Arts in English literature from University of Alabama in 1962 with Phi Beta Kappa honors. She was a Woodrow Wilson Fellow in 1962. In 1964, she completed a Master of Arts in sociology from Florida State University and was inducted into Phi Kappa Phi and Alpha Kappa Delta. She later earned a doctorate in sociology from the same institution in 1969. Her dissertation was titled Choice among professions: a comparative study of medicine, law, and college teaching. Her doctoral advisor was Charles M. Grigg.

== Career ==
Martin began working as an assistant professor and research associate at Florida State University in 1969.

== Awards and honors ==
In 2007, Martin was awarded the Jessie Bernard Award from the American Sociological Association.
