= Karen Oppenheim Mason =

American demographer

- Citizenship: United States
- Education: B.A. Reed College; Ph.D. University of Chicago
- Employer: World Bank
- Known for: Bringing gender theory into demography
- Title: President of the Population Association of America
- Term: 1997

Karen Oppenheim Mason was an American sociologist and demographer. She served as president of the Population Association of America in 1997 and was best known for her research on the relationship between changes in fertility patterns and social changes in gender roles.

== Early life and education ==
Mason grew up in a poor family in New York and attended Reed College on a scholarship, majoring in sociology. Mason earned her Ph.D. in sociology at the University of Chicago in 1968. She became a demographer while working in her first faculty position in the Department of Sociology at the University of Wisconsin.

== Career ==
After teaching at the University of Wisconsin for three years, Mason took a job at the Research Triangle Institute doing research on women's labor force participation in the Research Triangle area of North Carolina. In 1973, Mason moved to the University of Michigan, where she became a professor of Sociology and associate director of the Population Studies Center. She taught graduate courses on gender and undergraduate courses on the family. In 1980, Mason held a fellowship at the Center for Advanced Study in the Behavioral Sciences at Stanford University.

Through her research, Mason applied quantitative analysis to gender theory and gender theory to demography. In the second half of the twentieth century, birth rates were a central concern of demographers, who uncritically attributed fertility to women. Mason was among the first demographers to use gender theory to explain fertility trends, and to recognize the relationship between gender dynamics and fertility rates. Mason served as President of the Population Association of America in 1997. She devoted her presidential address to improving demographic understandings of fertility transition (long-term declines in average family size) by taking a perceptual, interactive approach.

Mason left the University of Michigan in 1991, first becoming Director of the Population Studies Program at the University of Hawai'i and of the Program on Population at the East-West Center, and then becoming Director of the Gender and Development Program at the World Bank in Washington, DC. She retired from this position in 2004.

== Selected publications ==
- Karen Oppenheim Mason. 1986. "The Status of Women: Conceptual and Methodological Issues in Demographic Studies." Sociological Forum 1(2): 284–300. doi:10.1007/BF01115740.
- Karen Oppenheim Mason. 1987. "The Impact of Women's Social Position on Fertility in Developing Countries." Sociological Forum 2(4): 718–745. doi:10.1007/BF01124382.
- Karen Oppenheim Mason and Anju Malhotra Taj. 1987. "Differences between Women's and Men's Reproductive Goals in Developing Countries." Population and Development Review 13(4): 611–638. doi:10.2307/1973025.
- Karen Oppenheim Mason and Yu-Hsia Lu. 1988. "Attitudes Toward Women's Familial Roles: Changes in the United States, 1977–1985." Gender & Society 2(1): 39–57. doi:10.1177/089124388002001004.
- Karen Oppenheim Mason and An-Magritt Jensen. 1995. Gender and Family Change in Industrialized Countries. New York: Oxford University Press. ISBN 0-19-828970-7.
- Karen Oppenheim Mason. 1997. "Explaining Fertility Transitions." Demography 34(4): 443–454. doi:10.2307/3038299.
- Karen Oppenheim Mason. 2001. "Gender and Family Systems in the Fertility Transition." Population and Development Review 27(Supplement): 160–176. jstor.org/stable/3115254.
