= Evelyn Nakano Glenn =

University professor

- Born: August 20, 1940 (age 86); Sacramento County, California, US
- Occupation: Professor

Evelyn Seiko Nakano Glenn is a professor at the University of California, Berkeley. In addition to her teaching and research responsibilities, she served as founding director of the university's Center for Race and Gender (CRG), a leading U.S. academic center for the study of intersectionality among gender, race and class social groups and institutions. In June 2008, Glenn was elected president of the 15,000-member American Sociological Association. She served as president-elect during the 2008–2009 academic year, assumed her presidency at the annual ASA national convention in San Francisco in August 2009, served as president of the association during the 2009–2010 year, and continued to serve on the ASA governing council as past-president until August 2011. Her presidential address, given at the 2010 meetings in Atlanta, was entitled "Constructing Citizenship: Exclusion, Subordination, and Resistance", and was printed as the lead article in the American Sociological Review.

Glenn's scholarly work focuses on the dynamics of race, gender, and class in processes of inequality and exclusion. Her early research documented the work and family lives of heretofore neglected women of color in domestic service and women in clerical occupations. This work drew her into historical research on the race and gender structure of local labor markets and the consequences of labor market position on workers, including the forms of resistance available to them. Most recently she has engaged in comparative analysis of race and gender in the construction of labor and citizenship across different regions of the United States.

Evelyn Nakano Glenn is author of Issei, Nisei, War Bride (Temple University Press), Unequal Freedom (Harvard University Press, 2002), "From Servitude to Service Work" (Signs: Journal of Women in Culture and Society), and Forced to Care: Coercion and Caregiving in America (Harvard University Press, 2010). She is also editor of Mothering (Routledge), and Shades of Difference: Why Skin Color Matters (Stanford University Press, 2009). Additionally, Glenn is the author of many journal articles, reviews, and commentaries. A review of her most recent book, Forced to Care stated, "Glenn's prose is concise and elegantly crafted, and despite the complexity of the subject matter, the reader is swept along with the force of the narrative structure."

== Biography ==
Glenn was born on August 20, 1940, in Sacramento County, California, to Nisei (second-generation Japanese immigrant) parents Makoto Nakano and Haruye Ito and was thus a Sansei (third-generation Japanese immigrant). From 1942 to 1945, Glenn and her parents, along with more than 120,000 other Japanese Americans, were interned in concentration camps following the signing of Executive Order 9066. Glenn's family was first assigned to live in the horse stables at a race track in Turlock, California, and thereafter was sent to the Gila River camp in the Arizona desert, and then to the Heart Mountain camp in the high country of Wyoming. When her family was released in 1945, they moved to Chicago, where Glenn was raised until the age of 16. The family returned to California and Glenn graduated from Oakland Technical High School in 1958.

Glenn received her BA in psychology from the University of California, Berkeley in 1962. She then went on to receive her PhD from Harvard University. Her first academic position was as Assistant Professor of Sociology at Boston University; she has also taught at Florida State University, Binghamton University, and was a visiting professor at the University of Hawaii. She has been at the University of California, Berkeley since 1990.

== Teaching ==
Glenn has taught a variety of courses having to do with research methods and theory in the social sciences, women and work, the Asian American family, comparative gender systems, race and social structures in the United States, and graduate seminars in gender, race, and class.

== Associations ==
- American Sociological Association, 1972–present (elected President in June 2008)
- Society for the Study of Social Problems, 1976–present (served as president, 1998–1999)
- Sociologists for Women in Society, 1983–present (served as Feminist Lecturer for Outstanding Sociology, 2008)
- Pacific Sociological Association
- Council on Contemporary Families
- Massachusetts Sociological Association (President, 1979–80)
- Association for Asian American Studies

== Awards ==
- 2018 Race, Gender, and Class Distinguished Career Award, American Sociological Association
- 2015 Asian American & Asian Disapora Studies Award, UC Berkeley
- 2013 KQED Asian American Local Heroes Award
- 2012 Lee Founders Award for Life Achievement("in recognition of significant achievements over a distinguished career, that have demonstrated a long-time devotion to the ideals ... and especially to the humanistic tradition of sociology ...") awarded by the Society for the Study of Social Problems 2011 at its national convention, August 2012.
- 2011 C.Wright Mills Award (finalist), for her book Forced to Care, awarded by Society for the Study of Social Problems.
- 2007 Sociologists for Women in Society, Feminist Lecturer for Outstanding Feminist Sociology.
- 2005 Jessie Bernard Award, American Sociological Association "in recognition of outstanding scholarship that has enlarged the horizons of sociology to encompass fully the role of women in society".
- 2004 Outstanding Book Award, American Sociological Association Section on Asia and Asian Americans, for her book Unequal Freedom.
- 2004 Distinguished Contribution to Scholarship Award, Pacific Sociological Association, for Unequal Freedom.
- 2003 Oliver Cromwell Cox Award, American Sociological Association, Section on Racial and Ethnic Minorities, for Unequal Freedom.
- 2003 Outstanding Achievement in Scholarship Award, American Sociological Association Section on Race, Gender, and Class, for Unequal Freedom.
- 2001 Visiting Scholar, The Havens Center, University of Wisconsin, Madison, Wisconsin.
- 1994 Outstanding Alumna Award, Japanese Women Alumnae of the University of California.
- 1994 Nikei of the Biennium Award for Outstanding Contributions to Education, Japanese American Citizens League (awarded at National Convention, Salt Lake City, Utah).
- 1993 Association of Black Women Historians, Leititia Woods Brown Memorial Article Prize for "From Servitude to Service Work: Historical Continuities in the Racial Division of Paid Reproductive Labor".

== Selected publications ==
=== Books ===
- Forced to Care: Coercion and Caregiving in America, Harvard University Press, 2010. ISBN 978-0-674-04879-9
- Shades of Difference: Why Skin Color Matters (ed.) Stanford University Press, 2009. ISBN 978-0-8047-5999-1
- Unequal Freedom: How Race and Gender Shaped American Citizenship and Labor, Cambridge: Harvard University Press, 2002. ISBN 978-0-674-01372-8
- Mothering: Ideology, Experience and Agency, Evelyn N. Glenn, Grace Chang, and Linda Forcey (eds), New York: Routledge, 1994. ISBN 978-0-415-90776-7
- Issei, Nisei, Warbride: Three Generations of Japanese American Women in Domestic Service, Philadelphia: Temple University Press, 1986. ISBN 978-0-87722-564-5
- Hidden Aspects of Women's Work, Christine Bose, Roslyn Feldberg, and Natalie Sokoloff, with the Women and Work Research Group (eds), New York: Praeger, 1987. ISBN 978-0-275-92415-7

=== Recent articles ===
- "Caring and Inequality" in Sharon Harley et al. (eds), Women's Labor in the Global Economy: Speaking in Multiple Voices, Rutgers University Press, 2007.
- "Whose Public Sociology? The Subaltern Speaks, But Who Is Listening?" in Dan Clawson, Robert Zussman, Joya Misra, Naomi Gerstel, Randall Stokes, Douglas L. Anderton and Michael Burawoy (eds), Public Sociology: Fifteen Eminent Sociologists Debate Politics and the Profession in the Twenty-first Century, Berkeley: University of California Press, 2007.
- "Race, Labor, and Citizenship in Hawai'i", in Donna Gabaccia and Vicki Ruiz (eds.) American Dreaming, Global Realities: Rethinking U.S. Immigration History, Urbana and Chicago: University of Illinois Press, 2006.
- "Race, Labor and Citizenship in Hawai'i", in Donna R. Gabaccia and Vicki L. Ruiz (eds.) American Dreaming, Global Realities: Rethinking U.S. Immigration History (Urbana & Chicago: University of Illinois Press, 2006).
- "Citizenship and Inequality", in Elizabeth Higginbotham and Margaret L. Anderson (eds.), Race and Ethnic in Society: The Changing Landscape (Wadsworth, 2006).
- "Gender, Race and Citizenship", om Judith Lorber (ed) Gender Inequality: Feminist Theory and Politics (Roxbury, 2005).
- "Citizenship and Inequality: Historical and Global Perspectives" in A. Kathryn Stout, Richard A. Dellobuono, William Cambliss (eds), Social Problems, Law, and Society (Rowman and Littlefield, 2004).
- "From Servitude to Service Work: Historical Continuities in the Racial Division of Paid Reproductive Labor", Signs: Journal of Women in Culture and Society, Fall 1992). (Reprinted in 12 separate anthologies and collections).
