= Jennifer Glass =

American sociologist

Academic background
- Education: University of Wisconsin–Madison

Academic work
- Discipline: Sociology
- Main interests: work and family issues, gender stratification

Jennifer L. Glass is Centennial Commission Professor of Liberal Arts in Sociology at the University of Texas at Austin. She was previously Professor of Sociology at the University of Southern California, University of Iowa and the University of Notre Dame.

== Early life ==
Glass received her B.A. of Social Science at the New College of Florida in 1977. She received her M.S. of sociology in 1979 and Ph.D. in sociology in 1983, both from the University of Wisconsin-Madison.

== Career ==
She was Professor of Sociology at the University of Notre Dame from 1985 to 1994. She subsequently joined the Department of Sociology at the University of Iowa from 1994 to 2011. She joined the department of sociology at the University of Texas at Austin in 2012.

She has been on various editorial board of academic journals, including the Gender & Society, Journal of Marriage and the Family, Social Problems, and American Sociological Review. Her work has also been featured in The New York Times.

She received American Sociological Association's Jessie Bernard Award in 2020.

== Selected work ==
- Glass, Jennifer L.; Estes, Sarah Beth (1997–08). "The Family Responsive Workplace". Annual Review of Sociology. 23 (1): 289–313. doi:10.1146/annurev.soc.23.1.289.
- Glass, Jennifer; Bengtson, Vern L.; Dunham, Charlotte Chorn (1986). "Attitude Similarity in Three-Generation Families: Socialization, Status Inheritance, or Reciprocal Influence?". American Sociological Review. 51 (5): 685–698. doi:10.2307/2095493.
