= District of Columbia Sociological Society =

Non-profit organization in Greater Washington, US

The District of Columbia Sociological Society (DCSS) is a non-profit organization for professional sociologists, sociology students and others in the Greater Washington area of the US. It was founded in 1934.

== Purpose ==
The Society aims to

- promote sociological research, education and discussion
- facilitate cooperative exchanges among people and organizations engaged in sociological research and teaching
- encourage young sociologists and students
- increase the contribution of sociology to human welfare.

== Awards ==
As of January 2025, the Society presents the following awards:

- the Stuart A. Rice Merit Award for Career Achievement. This is for professionals who have made a substantial contribution to sociology over at least 25 years.
- the Irene B. Taeuber Graduate Student Paper Awards. A competition where each entrant submits a paper then one MA student and one PhD student is selected for the award.
- the Morris Rosenberg Award for Outstanding Sociological Achievement: by a member of the Society, and during the past three years.
- the Anna Julia Cooper Award for Public Sociology by a Community Organization. For community groups that use sociological methods or theory to try to address socially produced inequality.

== Membership ==
Anyone interested in the objectives of the Society is eligible for membership. Members are defined as people who have paid the current year's membership fee, which is a requirement for voting in the Society's annual election.
