= The Sperm Bank of California =

Non-profit sperm bank in Berkeley, California

The Sperm Bank of California (TSBC) is a nonprofit sperm bank in Berkeley, California. It was founded by Barbara Raboy in 1982.

It has a program through which adults conceived from a sperm donation can contact the donor, which was first such program offered by a sperm bank. Many of the donors at the sperm bank take part in this program. According to a 2002 article, at the time 1,100 children had been conceived with the help of the bank and officials of the bank said roughly four out of five clients had chosen the donor ID release option. The bank serves a large lesbian and single-mother-by-choice clientele.
