= Sociology of gender =

Branch of the discipline of sociology

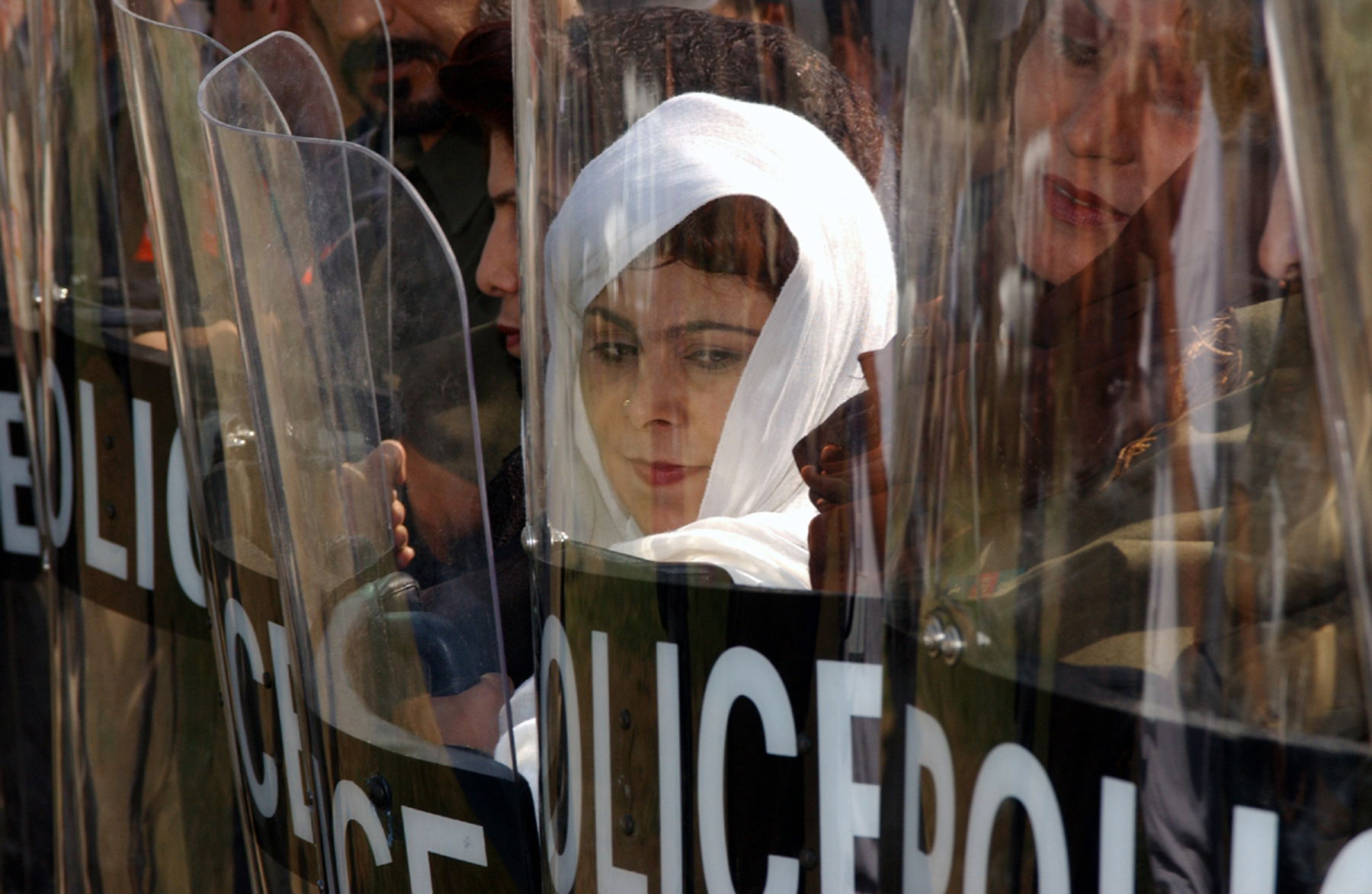
Kabul, Afghanistan, before the restoration of the Islamic Emirate by the Taliban. Women Afghan National Police officers, working hand-in-hand with their men counterparts, learn the finer points on how to use non-lethal force to quell civil disturbances during riot training conducted by U.S. forces.

Sociology of gender is a subfield of sociology. One of the most important social structures is status (position that an individual possesses which affects how they are treated by society), and one of the most important statuses an individual claims is gender. Public discourse and the academic literature generally use the term gender for the perceived or projected (self-identified) masculinity or femininity of a person.

== Introduction ==
The term gender role was coined by John Money in a seminal 1955 paper where he defined it as "all those things that a person says or does to disclose himself or herself as having the status of boy or man, girl or woman."

According to American gender theorist Judith Butler, a person's gender is complex, encompassing countless characteristics of appearance, speech, movement and other factors not solely limited to biological sex. Many societies have binary gender systems in which everyone is categorized as male or female. Some societies include a third gender role; for instance, the Native American Two-Spirit people and the Hijras of India. There is debate over the extent to which gender is a social construct or a biological construct.

== In feminist theory ==
In the 1960s and 1970s, the women's movement started the momentum that led to the formation of feminist theory. One of the publications that launched this movement was Betty Friedan's The Feminine Mystique. This book, describing how women were expected to be fulfilled through their housework, immediately resonated with many women and became a bestseller, igniting a movement. During this movement, also known as the women's rights movement or women's liberation movement, women fought for equal rights, and more personal freedom in all aspects of life such as politics, work, family and sexuality. In June 1966, the National Organization for Women (NOW) was created by women's rights activists Betty Friedan, Pauli Murray, Shirley Chisholm, and Muriel Fox to advance political and social equality for women. Although the organization did not succeed initially, by 1969 NOW was in a position to lobby for women's reform in Washington. In 1972, Congress passed the Equal Rights Amendment (ERA). Despite it being a victory for feminism, the passage of the ERA led to criticism from anti-feminists, who argued that the ratification of the ERA would result in the invalidation of sodomy laws, and would lead to the legalization of same-sex marriage. The ERA needed to be ratified by 38 states in ten years, and fell short by three. This occurred in the second wave of feminism, after the first wave in the 19th century for women's suffrage, and the foundation of early feminist theory.

During the 1970s, there was no consensus about how the terms were to be applied. In the 1974 edition of Masculine/Feminine or Human, the author uses "innate gender" and "learned sex roles", but in the 1978 edition, the use of sex and gender is reversed. By 1980, most feminist writings had agreed on using gender only for sociocultural adapted traits.

Feminist theory is a broad term for a variety of theories which all emphasise women's experiences and the belief that society is subordinate to women. Liberal feminism is the belief that individuals should be free to develop their own talents and pursue their interests. Individuals seek to expand equality by removing the barriers in society. According to socialist feminism, capitalism strengthens patriarchy by concentrating wealth and power in the hands of a few, and the traditional family structure should be replaced by a collective revolution. Radical feminism espouses the view that patriarchy is so deeply rooted in society that it cannot be allayed even by a sociological revolution: society must eliminate gender itself.

Early feminist theory targeted sex and gender and the injustices based on these gender categories. However, the early feminist movement was geared towards the equality for white middle-class women, and excluded other minority women, especially black women. Minority women face different experiences and struggles from white middle-class women, but this was largely overlooked in early feminist theory. However, this theory allowed for the birth of feminism, which focuses on women's empowerment, freedom, and the enhancement of a woman's sense of self. As time progresses, feminism can be broken into four distinct waves: first-wave from the 19th to early 20th century, second-wave feminism from the 1960s to 1970s, to the third and fourth waves of feminism from the 1990s to now. Each wave of feminism has its own goal that focused on the importance of equality among men and women in regards to social, political, and economic equality. In the first wave, feminists focused on women's suffrage, or giving women the right to vote. It was a movement that pushed for political equality so that women could participate in politics. But in this movement, it mainly advocated for the right to vote for white women, while excluding minority women. The exclusion of minority women in first movement sparked the acknowledgement of minority groups in the second movement. However, the second movement mainly dealt with sexuality and reproductive rights. The movement worked toward the passing of the Equal Rights Amendment, which was designed to guarantee equal rights for everyone regardless of their sex. By the end of this wave, society began to realize that gender, the idea of what it means to be a "woman", and society's expectations of what a woman is, are socially constructed. This realization led to the rise of the third feminist movement. It focused on debunking the predominant idea society held for women and their position in society. In this movement, the notion of being "girly" or "feminine" is broken down to redefine society's definition of a woman. The boundaries of gender are reconstructed to allow people to experiment with the fluidity of gender. However, this movement also combats the sexism and patriarchy, or the system in which men hold all the power. This is shown through the domination of sexist culture, where women are looked down upon for the same actions or experiences men partake in.

The fourth wave of feminism began in 2013 and centers around sexual harassment, rape culture, and body shaming. One of the major distinctions in this wave is the use of social media and the internet to spread its messages. This wave erupted after a young woman in India died after being brutally gang raped. Another catalyst to this wave of feminism was the election of president Donald Trump in 2016 after his remarks about women. One day after President Trump's inauguration, in 2017, about 4.6 million people took to the streets of Washington, DC, for the Women's March to protest gender equality. Also in 2017, the Me Too movement gained popularity, in which women came forward to share their experiences of sexual assault after it became known that Harvey Weinstein sexually assaulted women for years in the film industry. This movement grew in only a couple of months to condemn powerful men in business, politics, news, and entertainment for their assaults against women.

== Other languages ==
In English, both sex and gender are used in contexts where they could not be substituted (sexual intercourse; anal sex; safe sex; sex worker; sex slave). Other languages, like German, use the same word Geschlecht to refer both to grammatical gender and to biological sex, making the distinction between sex and gender advocated by some anthropologists difficult. In some contexts, German has adopted the English loan-word gender to achieve this distinction. Sometimes 'Geschlechtsidentität' is used as gender (although it literally means gender identity) and 'Geschlecht' as sex (translation of Judith Butler's Gender Trouble). More common is the use of modifiers: biologisches Geschlecht for sex, Geschlechtsidentität for gender identity and Geschlechterrolle for gender role etc.

== U.S. media ==
Media criticism is a reflection of the gender inequality in society through print, advertisements, television and music. The media is often criticized for holding women to unrealistic beauty standards: perfect skin, slim figure, and great hair. Some argue that the media's standards of beauty led to young girls having a lower self esteem, and blame the media for contributing to eating disorders. The US media is also criticized for displaying images which depict violence against women. Studies have revealed ways in which women are maimed, sliced, and raped in advertising images. However, the media is a product of different cultural values. Western culture creates cultural gender roles based on the meanings of gender and cultural practices. Western culture has clear distinctions among sex and gender, where sex comprises the biological differences whereas gender is the social construction. However, sex still influences how society perceives a certain gender. Since culture is a societal artifact, communication is essential to the formation of gender roles in culture and in the media. The attitudes and mentalities found in culture and in the media are generated and passed on through communication. Therefore, communication, often through the media, is what teaches a person in society how to act male or act female. Media influences and reinforces the idea of The Beauty Myth as discussed in Naomi Wolf's book, The Beauty Myth: How Images of Beauty Are Used Against Women, which refers to unrealistic standards of beauty for women. Some argue that the mainstream media perpetuates the idea of hetero-masculinity by portraying men as dominant. Some also argue that the media objectifies and oppresses women, as well as men who do not fall into the heteronormative category.

=== Oppression ===
Through the media, men are taught to be ultra-masculine by being desensitized, violent, and physically strong. Other forms of media that often portray the ultra-masculine figure are advertisements, the Hollywood movie industry, and video games. These forms encourage men to oppress other men if they do not fit the ideals of hegemonic masculinity, as well as to develop a self-validation system where men aim to uphold these ideals of the masculine male. It is theorized that this further amplifies and legitimates the repression of the female in relation to the male.

Throughout history, women have been excluded from media agencies, a key issue highlighted as early as the 18th century by the European and North American suffragists movement. Although stories were published about women, they were often trivialized or biased against women by the patriarchy of all-male news outlets. The suffragist movement was adamant in forming their own media outlet in order to further the knowledge in women's issues and achievements. Due to the patriarchal systems of pre-existing news media outlets, women were forced to form their own media outlets, seeing as it having been nearly impossible for women to 'climb the ladder' in terms of corporate hierarchy when looking at newsrooms, radio stations, and editors for the newspapers themselves. By the 20th century, a diaspora of information regarding women and feminist issues, including the likes of women's discrimination within the work place and voting rights, were published in a variety of news media outlets to shed light on the current issues of women and to extend the equality and protection of women's rights through public education. As part of the United Nations Sustainable Development Goal #5 (SDGs), the UN Women Media Compact was established in order to promote and vitalize equality within media outlets—more specifically to subdue the oppression of women within media.

=== Objectification of women ===
Objectification of women refers to instances in the media in which women may be viewed as, or directly compared to, insentient objects that can be acquired and possessed. This can be examined in the context of advertisements, where objects may be anthropomorphized and given feminine qualities or aspects of the female form. While most instances of objectification arise from underlying male sexual desires, objectification is not always sexual. Anytime a woman is viewed as a device for the benefit of another, this is considered objectification. Some studies indicate that widespread objectification of women in the media may have significant repercussions on society, such as low self-esteem and eating disorders among women.

== Gender and socialization ==
Socialization is the process where individuals learn the norms, values, and rules of a society in order to become a functioning member in it. Socialization theory offers a straightforward account of the acquisition of gendered identities. Infants are seen as blank slates, waiting to be written down on by their environment. Through their interactions with people close to them and exposure to the values of their society, infants learn what gender is attributed to them and what roles they are expected to learn. Reinforcement (through rewarding gender-appropriate behavior and punishing what may seem as deviant behavior) socializes children into their genders.

For children, the primary agent of socialization for them is their parents. At a young age, children are taught societal rules and norms for specific genders. These norms, also known as gender roles, outline what is expected from males and females. From the moment of birth and onwards, parental expectations for their child are set by their gender. For example, parents are far more likely to engage with their sons in rough physical play than they are with their daughters, and it has been argued that long-term consequences may follow (in this case, a head start for boys in the development of physical violence and aggressiveness). Parents and family can influence the way that a child develops their view of gender. These types of influences can include parental attitudes and difference of treatment regarding male and female children. Researcher Susan Witt claims that parents also expose children to gender from the time they are born via specific toys, colors, and names associated with genders in the binary. Witt suggests that parental attitudes about gender can differ from male to female children and that these attitudes develop quickly after a child's birth. Parents influence the way children behave and think at home, which is then carried out into the real world where the child is exposed to an environment that reinforces such ideas and beliefs.

Author Susan Grieshaber, in "Constructing the Gendered Infant", suggests that attitudes regarding pregnancy change after parents find out the sex of their child, subsequently changing parental attitudes towards the unborn child. According to Grieshaber's theory, once parents determine the sex of their unborn child, they assume a gender while planning for the child's arrival. Because of this, Grieshaber claims that infants are born into a gendered world where they never know anything other than the gender traits that are assumed due to their sex. Kara Smith utilizes similar theory throughout the analysis of her pregnancy journals kept throughout her second pregnancy. Smith concluded that her attitude towards her child changed after learning that her child's sex was male. Smith's claim is reflected in changes in tone of voice when talking to the unborn child as well as differences in physical touch of her stomach throughout the rest of her pregnancy. Another theory of gender socialization, discussed by Susan McHale, is that the gender roles and attitudes of older siblings can impact the gender roles adopted by younger children. Throughout the findings of McHale's study, it is maintained that parents still have the most familial influence on childhood socialization.

By the time children reach the age of three, many will have acquired a firm sense of themselves as male or female, a gender identity that remains throughout life. In addition, many pre-schoolers develop a firm awareness of gender stereotypes, insisting that certain activities or items of clothing are not for girls and others not for boys. Yet gender identity does not automatically follow from biological sex even though it has a large effect on it.

Adults respond differently to communicative efforts of boys and girls. A study of infants aged 13 months found that when boys demand attention – by behaving aggressively, or crying, whining or screaming – they tended to get it. By contrast, adults tended to respond to girls only when they used language, gestures, or gentle touches; girls who used attention-seeking techniques were likely ignored. There was little difference in the communicative patterns at the start of the study, but by the age of two, the girls have become more talkative and boys more assertive in their communicative techniques.

The norms that are taught throughout childhood are influential in an individual's life because the ideas about gender that are typically taught by parents in early years are reinforced outside of the home. A study done by Mick Cunningham states that the normative behaviors and attitudes that children observe can influence the way that these children grow up to structure their own households in adulthood. Normative gender roles can be reinforced outside of the household, adding power to these established ideas about gender. An analysis of children's books in the twenty-first century, by Janice McCabe, suggests that this particular avenue of children's media symbolically annihilates females, representing them about half as often as that of males. Underrepresentation such as this can affect children and their views of gender. Children's TV networks, such as Disney, Nickelodeon, and Cartoon Network, have demonstrated a disproportional representation of males and females on their respective shows in a study done by Beth Hentges and Kim Case. According to Hentges and Case, there are less female characters across all three children's networks; however, there is more propagation of stereotypical gendered behavior on Cartoon Network and Nickelodeon than on Disney.

=== Atypical household influence on gender socialization ===
Some children are raised in atypical households that challenge normative gender roles. In Jada Tidwell's study, she observes the play of children who come from households with lesbian feminist mothers (both single mothers and couples). Tidwell's observations consisted of both individual play as well as play integrated with the mothers. As a result of these observations, Tidwell asserts that atypical environments can affect children's lives and ideas. According to Tidwell, households that challenge hegemonic cultural ideas ultimately give children a different perspective of gender than those of children raised in heterosexual, two parent households. In the families studied by Jada Tidwell, children reported ideas that both endorsed and challenged stereotypical gender roles at times. In a different study, Abbie Goldberg observed toddlers from various types of households and how these children engaged in play. Goldberg's findings suggest that children whose parents are of the same gender tend to play in ways that are less adherent to stereotypical gender roles than children from heterosexual households. Susan Witt, in her article "Parental Influence on Children's Socialization to Gender Roles", advocates for androgynous gender roles in parenting, arguing that such environments are more open minded about gender and encouraging to both their sons and daughters.

== Gender and psychoanalysis ==
One of the most influential of the psychoanalytic theories of gender identity is the perspective developed in the book The Reproduction of Mothering. Its author, Nancy Chodorow, traces the implications for emotional development by linking them with the way mothers usually care for their infants in their formative years, while fathers are more emotionally distant. The development of an identity takes place as the infant gets more and more separated from their mother, with whom the infant is initially psychically merged. This process operates differently for boys and girls. Girls can separate gradually, maintain a continuous sense of relationship with the mother, who is after all experienced as alike. For boys, on the other hand, separating from the mother, who is experienced as different, involves repressing the feminine aspects of themselves and rejecting their tenderness that was central to that early relationship. Boys' sense of maleness, according to Chodorow, is achieved at a great emotional cost.

Consequently, men grow up to have a more autonomous sense of self, and to be more independent, more instrumental and competitive in their dealings with others. They are also more likely to have difficulty expressing their emotions and to be anxious about intimacy. Women, on the other hand, have more ability and more need to sustain relationship with others; they have greater empathy with others. They have difficulty in maintaining the boundaries of an independent and autonomous self.

Chodorow, however, believes that these patterns are not inevitable. Changes in the social arrangements for care of children such as dual parenting, which would involve fathers in emotional intimacy with their children, can break the cycle.

== Gender and the division of labor ==
Before industrialization, economic activity, which centered around agricultural work, crafts and so on, was organized by households. Household members, whether male or female, young or old, contributed to the family's livelihood. Although women might do some types of work and men others, depending on region and class, the distinction between men as breadwinners and women as housewives did not characterize pre-industrial divisions of labor.

Industrialization shifted much productive activity to factories, shops and offices. This separation of work from home signaled a profound change in gender relations and gender discourse. The home came to be understood not as the site of a family enterprise, but as a refuge from the world of work. Women were defined as the keepers of the home, as it was seen as their nature to create harmony and virtue rather than services and goods. Preindustrial society relied on gendered roles in the workforce to create equilibrium between men and women. Men were assigned the hunter role while women were assigned the domestic roles. Men were expected to supply food and shelter for the family while women were the caretakers for the children and their household. As centuries passed, this continued and created a divide in gendered roles in labor. Women remained dependent on men to provide, this dependence led to male roles being more valued in society which still remains in the 21st century.

The divisions of labor ensures people with specific skill sets end up in certain jobs in order to benefit society. Where women fit into the workforce and how women benefit society were impacted by differences between the gender stereotypes of men and women. Based on stereotypes, males are perceived to be more suitable for the highest positions while women are not. Women are believed to lack the qualities needed to obtain male dominated occupations like management and CEO positions. Despite the greater number of women entering the workforce in recent years, men continue to dominate the workforce and women are still viewed as inferior. With the constant negative perceptions of women in traditionally male occupations, research has shown that women approach tasks that are assumed to be for males with low confidence and self-esteem. This is due to the belief that they are not competent enough to complete such tasks.

In the United States, Title VII and the 1964 Civil Rights Act were passed to attempt to ensure the equal treatment of the growing number of women entering the workforce. However, women are still subjected to forms of sexual harassment, which ranges from jokes to threats. The most common form of sexual harassment is "hostile environments", which aims to make women feel unsafe and uncomfortable. This sexual harassment serves as a means of men enforcing their superiority over women, and it is one of the most prominent forms of gender inequality in the workplace.

== Gender in conversation ==
Some research has found that, in classroom settings, male students tend to talk more, and longer, than female students. This was determined to be particularly noticeable when the instructor is male.

Similar results were found previously in hospitals by Erving Goffman in 1961, university discussion groups by Elizabeth Aries in 1972, and in corporate settings by Rosabeth Kanter in 1977.

=== Gender in the workplace ===
Women and men experience different types of mobility within the workplace. For example, women tend to experience a glass ceiling, an invisible barrier that prevents them from moving up the corporate ladder. An example of this is a study from Sweden that compared the number of females in director jobs to men in director jobs. The study showed that there were statistically more men than women holding those jobs and showed that the results were also shown in other countries such as the USA. Men in jobs traditionally held by women, such as nursing, elementary school teaching, and social work, experience a "glass escalator" effect in which they are able to quickly ascend the job hierarchy to become managers and principals. There also tends to be a gender pay gap between men and women, with women earning 77% as much as men.

One cause of the gender pay gap may be due to occupational segregation, which pushes men and women towards gender-specific forms of employment, rather than pay discrimination. Another possible cause is the double burden, a phenomenon in which women perform most of the unpaid childcare and household work despite being otherwise employed for pay. A third possible cause is occupational sexism, one part of which favors men for promotions due to their traditional breadwinner status. The 2001 class action lawsuit, Dukes v. Wal-Mart Stores, Inc., charged Wal-Mart with sexist hiring and promotion practices.

There were also studies done that showed that having women in higher paying positions would correlate to an increased chance of depressive symptoms. These studies talked about how the depression was caused by the negative social experiences at their job, such as social isolation and negative social interactions, that weaken the mental health of the women in authority positions. Of which referenced that men had more value for their status in the work place than women. These social interactions would have been caused by cultural gender norms. Parallel to the social norms, women are stuck in the expectations placed upon them based on these norms. This places the identity of follower onto women since that is what the norm dictated.

In China, women have experienced gender based discrimination based on job requirements that represent indirect discrimination. An example would be a job listing available to everyone but required the individual to be able to carry a set amount of weight or to be a certain height, without there being a need for that requirement in that job. These requirements prevent set groups from getting that job, but is labeled implicitly.

In addition, the emergence of transgender individuals in the workplace has begun to disrupt the gender binary of male and female. By creating a hybrid gender identity, the non-binary community can be seen to embody and advance postgenderism.

==== US workplace ====
In the US, it is common for companies to adopt policies that allow women to be on maternity leave during and after pregnancy. As a result, there are many positive health benefits, such as better "overall maternal health, improving mother's mental health, [and] promoting mother-infant interaction". However, the US is one of the few countries that do not allow women to be on paid maternity leave after giving birth. This leads to negative outcomes since many families can not live off of a single income.

US policies lack focus on men and do not include paternity leave. Between 1995 and 2005, about 13,000 men on average were on paternity leave compared to 273,000 women. Despite the low number of male workers on paternity leave, it has a wide range of benefits for the household, some of which include "assisting mothers in their childbirth recovery...[and] encouraging father involvement". Countries such as Canada and Sweden, which offer paternity leave, have lower infant mortality and better maternal health (both mental and physical). These countries also demonstrate how paternity leave is economically viable. However, there is an existing perception in society that discourages male workers to take paternity leave. Society's norms of traditional masculinity hold that men should prioritize work over family life, which is deemed a job for women. The lack of policies encouraging paternity leave, together with society's notion that men should remain in the workplace, aim to discourage fathers' involvement with their young children and to enforce the traditional gender roles.

== Intersectionality ==
Intersectionality is a concept stemming from a critical theory social analysis of class, race, and gender. The theory of intersectionality argues that forms of "inequality, oppression, and privilege" are shaped by interconnected axes of identity, and are mutually reinforced by social interactions and by social, political, and economic structures, such as capitalism, patriarchy, and institutionalized heteronormativity. The theory of Intersectionality argues that race, class, gender, and other markers of identity are social constructions. This theory argues against the assumption that systems of power relations are normative and can hold individuals accountable for their own character and efforts.

West & Fenstermaker in their 1995 article Doing Difference offer that models that conceive gender, race and class as distinct axes are highly limiting in their understanding of the whole experience or identity of an individual. For example, they critique the additive model, in which the whole will never be greater (or lesser) than the sum of it parts. By analyzing each identity marker as an individual characteristic, we ignore the effect of the interconnection of these markers.

Additional sociologists have written about the intersectionality of class, race, and gender. Joan Acker outlines four gendered processes of intersectionality. The first includes procedures that create hierarchies based on gender and race. Another is the process in which social images and ideas condone gendered institutions. The third is a process of interaction between individuals and groups that, through communication, creates gender. The fourth is the internal labeling of the self and others to gendered personas. Evelyn Nakano Glenn critiques both the patriarchy model of gender, which ignores racial differences among oppressed women, and the internal colonialism model, which focuses on minority populations in general, ignoring gender differences.

== Embodiment ==
Embodiment may be defined as the ways in which cultural ideals of gender in a given society create expectations for and influence the form of our bodies. There is a bidirectional relationship between biology and culture; by embodying societally determined gender roles we reinforce cultural ideals and simultaneously shape, both temporarily and permanently, our bodies, which then perpetuates the cultural ideal. While there is actually more variation in body type within the male and female sexes than there is between the two sexes, embodiment exaggerates the perceived bodily differences between gender categories.

Social embodiment, for both men and women, is variable across cultures and over time. Examples of women embodying gender norms across cultures include foot binding practices in Chinese culture, neck rings in African and Asian cultures, and corsets in Western cultures. Another interesting phenomenon has been the practice of wearing high heels, which shifted from a masculine fashion to a feminine fashion over time. In the United States, the ideal body image and dimensions have changed for both women and men, with the body ideal female body shape becoming progressively slimmer and the body ideal for men becoming progressively larger.

These differences are epitomized in the example of children's toys; G.I. Joe dolls depict the physical ideals for boys and Barbie dolls embody the ideals for girls. The Beauty Myth, as discussed in Naomi Wolf's book The Beauty Myth: How Images of Beauty Are Used Against Women, refers to the unattainable standard of beauty for women, which sustains consumer culture. In contrast, men's bodies are also "dictated" by cultural ideals of gender, as is evident in consumer culture—especially beer commercials—in which men are portrayed as outdoorsy, tough, strong, and "manly".

== Sexuality ==
Sexuality encompasses both sexual behavior and sexual desire. However, heteronormativity structures social life so that heterosexuality is always assumed, expected, ordinary and privileged. Its pervasiveness makes it difficult for people to imagine other ways of life. Mass media works to glorify heterosexuality, which in turn lends to its pervasiveness and to its power. Both ordinary and exceptional constructions of heterosexuality work to normalize heterosexuality; thus, it becomes difficult to imagine anything other than this form of social relationship or anyone outside of these bonds.

There is a common perception of heterosexuality as the "natural" emotional and sensual inclination for human sexuality. Furthermore, marital heterosexuality occupies the largely invisible core of normative and desirable sexuality, while all other sexualities are marginalized and considered perverse and unnatural. Alfred Kinsey created a Heterosexual-Homosexual Rating Scale called the Kinsey Scale, which challenges the common perception of human sexuality as strictly binary and directly linked to gender. Drag queens are an example of "troubling" gender, complicating the understanding of sexuality in our society by causing people to think outside the binary of male/female.

Friedrich Engels argued that in hunter-gatherer societies the activities of men and women, although different, had the same importance. As technological advances let to productive surplus, social equality and communal sharing gave way to private property and ultimately class hierarchy. With the rise of agriculture, men gained significant power over women. With surplus wealth to pass on to their heirs, upper-class men wanted to ensure their sons were indeed theirs, which led them to control the sexuality of women. The desire to control property brought about monogamous marriage and family. Women were taught to remain virgins until marriage and remain faithful to their husbands thereafter, and to build their lives around bearing and raising one man's children.

== Masculinity ==
Masculinity is a performed gender identity. It is not the same as male sex or related to any specific sexual orientation. The contents and practices of masculinity are socially constructed and reproduced through daily interaction, especially on a more micro scale. Theorists West & Zimmerman emphasized that gender is maintained through accountability. Men are expected to perform masculinity to the point that it is naturalized. Thus, a man's status depends on his performance. However, masculinity can be performed by any sex.

The dominant form of masculinity in a society is known as hegemonic masculinity. Men are constantly performing this to prove their status as men. It is not really possible to reach it, especially as peers are in constant surveillance of each other, looking for flaws in their performance. Hegemonic masculinity is constructed in opposition to femininity and is dominant to all other gender identities (including alternative masculinities). Men are socialized from birth to perform it, especially through behavior and symbolism. One of the prominent behaviors is aggression in order to protect one's reputation. An example of symbols used would be clothing.

Sociologist Michael Kimmel describes three cultures that support masculinity (especially in young men) in his 2008 book, Guyland:

- The Culture of Entitlement: Men are raised to feel they deserve something. They feel entitled to power, sex and women.
- The Culture of Silence: Men are not to talk to outsiders (those not embedded in the cultures of masculinity) about drinking, bullying, rape, or any performance of masculinity by their peers that they may get in trouble for. If they do talk, they will be seen as unmanly traitors.
- The Culture of Protection: Communities do not hold men responsible for questionable and illegal actions. Many turn a blind eye, assuming their boys would never do that. Others write off dangerous acts as "boys will be boys".

Some of the prominent attitudes and behaviors of western hegemonic masculinity are: power, sexual dominance and activity, wealth, aggression, independence, and lack of emotion. Less extreme sexual harassment is often seen as normal behavior. Exemplifying control theory, the norms of masculinity are so rigidly ingrained that men find little room to escape and end up constantly reproducing them.

Hegemonic masculinity is often reproduced and reinforced through media and culture. "Media representations of men…often glorify men's use of physical force, a daring demeanor, virility, and emotional distance." Contemporary rap music is a striking example of masculinity on display. Rappers boast about their sexual conquests of women (emphasizing heterosexuality as well), wealth, power and violence.

== Gender and violence ==
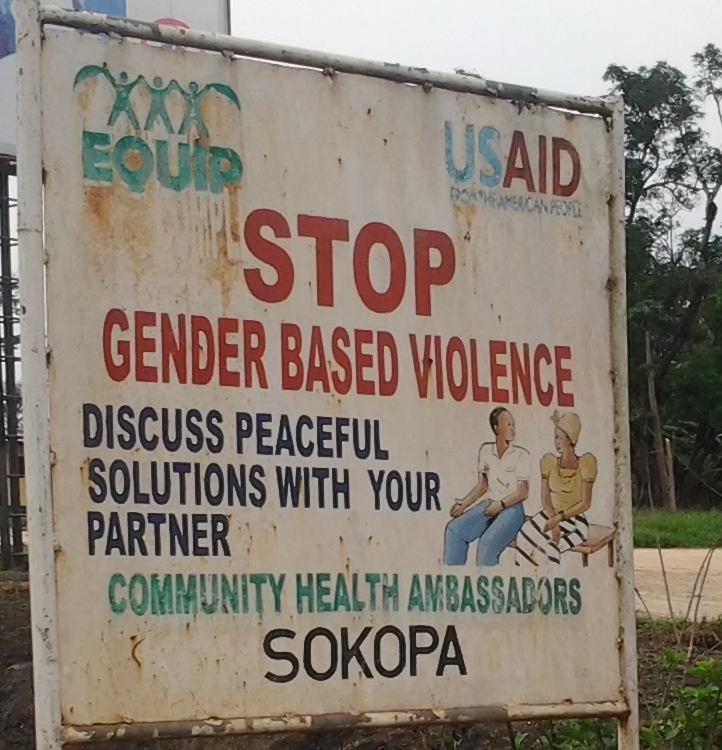
Sign in Liberia about gender-based violence

Gender-based violence is the physical, sexual or emotional harm or suffering enacted upon an individual as contextualized by societal gender norms. Violence affects the lives of millions worldwide, in all socio-economic and educational classes. It cuts across cultural and religious barriers, impeding the right of many to participate fully in society. Violence is about power, control, and domination. Systems of inequality and oppression interact positioning certain groups as particularly vulnerable to violence. Gendered violence takes place within a socially constructed power dynamic in which one ideology (masculinity) dominates another (femininity). What it means to be a woman in society is influenced and ascribed by the media, which acts as a powerful educational force. Media glamorizes violence against women, cultivating a toxic cultural environment in which women are institutionally positioned as inferior objects worthy of violence.

Men are disproportionally the offenders, and women disproportionally the victims. Those that commit violent crimes are overwhelmingly male—rape (98%), armed robbery (92%), drunk driving (90%), murder (88%), aggravated assault (87%), arson (86%), and family violence (83%). According to Michael Kimmel, hegemonic masculinity creates a culture of entitlement, silence, and protection, which effectively normalizes violence against women and silences victims of violence.

The Declaration on the Elimination of Violence defines three social arenas in which violence commonly takes place: (1) in the family—including domestic violence, infanticide, and traditional practices such as female genital mutilation, foot binding, and bride burning; (2) in the community—including rape, sexual assault, sexual harassment, and commercialized violence such as sexual slavery, labor exploitation, female migrant workers; and (3) by the state—including violence against women in detention, and in situations of armed conflict such as systematic war rape. In order to address and end gendered violence, solutions must address both the root causes and interpersonal manifestations of gender roles and power relations in order to ensure a balance of power at all levels of society.

Gender violence is also very entwined with one's racial identity, and it can create a unique intersectional experience for the victims of gender violence. Frequently within dominant U.S. culture, institutions, teachers, social workers, and even friends and family will ignore the violence perpetuated against women of color, as they are not seen as valid members of society who deserve basic autonomy over their safety. Women of color tend to experience higher rates of domestic violence and sexual assault than the general population and are less likely to seek help when it happens. There are many different reasons for this lack of reporting, including societal barriers preventing reports being made, like a lack of services in their communities, a fear that police will not take the report seriously, or even fear of internal repercussions from other members of their communities, if their assaulter was a Black man. Another example of this gender violence against women of color are indigenous women. The Missing and Murdered Indigenous Women, Girls, and Two-Spirit movement "condemns the failure of law enforcement agencies to stop the appalling disappearances, abuse, and murders of Indigenous women."

An additional point to note is that women of color are often entrapped in domestic working positions, which are often abusive, with few workplace protections, legal protections, or access to union organizing.

== Globalization and gender ==
Globalization refers to the increasingly global relationships of culture, people and economic activity. Globalization impacts female equality on a large and international scale, both negatively and positively. With continuous changes in international relations, the perception of feminism in Western and Nonwestern societies is frequently revised. It is important to be wary of Western bias in sociological accounts of global feminism, as Modern Western society is not always due credit for feminist reform in other cultures and countries.

Feminist sentiments – or a push for gender equality – emerge as a result of the nation-specific circumstances, not according to the exported beliefs of Western society. Advances in female equality and status are often not the result of national groups or corporations, but of individuals and small groups.

One of the results of globalization is the increased use of female factory workers in nonwestern countries. In Mexico, the female worker is ideal because she is seen as docile and inexpensive labor. Stereotypical feminine traits such as beauty, domesticity, and docility are exaggerated and exploited for the production of goods. These gender traits then frame the behavior of the women beyond the occupational realm. Despite increasing feminism, the lack of economic and social mobility prevents women in many nations from having equal status in society.

One of the solutions to erasing gender inequalities globally, is to provide resources and funds to impoverished women who will in turn use them for education as well as business ventures. The global economy could benefit drastically from incorporating educated women into the workforce. Women would then be able to partake in society and be involved as they please.

== Third gender ==
Throughout history, and around the world, the idea of a third gender has existed. In Native American culture, the two spirit had gender roles different from men and women. More specifically, in Navajo society, the third gender is known as nadle. Nadle is a gender that does tasks commonly for both men and women, but also dresses according to whatever task they are doing at the moment. The muxe of southern Mexico are biological males who identify as neither male nor female. In Samoa, the Fa'afafine are biological males who identify as females. In Indian society, the hijra include eunuchs, intersex people, and transgender people. They give up sexual desires and participate in sexual practices by sacrificial emasculation, or the removal of the testicles and penis. They are considered outsiders in their communities and have formed their own language. In the United States, the concept of a third gender is beginning to gain traction. Some jurisdictions, such as California, now permit a third non-binary gender; this is generally marked on IDs as an "X".

== See also ==
- Anti-gender movement
- Atypical gender role
- Bibliography of sociology
- Feminization (sociology)
- Gender and politics
- Gender empowerment
- Gender essentialism
- Gender role
- Sex differences in humans
- Sex segregation
- Sexism
- Social construction of gender
