= Gender & Society =

- Discipline: Gender studies
- Language: English
- Edited by: Sharmila Rudrappa and Patricia Richards

Publication details
- History: 1987-present
- Publisher: SAGE Publications in association with Sociologists for Women in Society
- Frequency: Bimonthly
- Impact factor: 2.36 (2017)

Standard abbreviations
- ISO 4: Gend. Soc.

Indexing
- ISSN: 0891-2432 (print); 1552-3977 (web)
- LCCN: 87641814
- OCLC no.: 14687475

Links
- Journal homepage; Online access; Online archive

Gender & Society is a peer-reviewed academic journal that covers research in the field of gender studies. The co-editors are Sharmila Rudrappa (University of Texas at Austin) and Patricia Richards (University of Georgia). It was established in 1987 and is currently published by SAGE Publications in association with Sociologists for Women in Society.

== Introduction ==
Articles appearing in Gender & Society analyze gender and gendered processes in interactions, organizations, societies, and global and transnational spaces. The journal primarily publishes empirical articles, including qualitative, quantitative, and comparative-historical methodologies.

== Abstracting and indexing ==
Gender & Society is abstracted and indexed in over 70 databases including Scopus and the Social Sciences Citation Index. According to Journal Citation Reports, the journal has a 2023 impact factor of 7.2, ranking it 1st out of 66 journals in the category "Women's Studies" and 3rd out of 217 journals in the category "Sociology."

== See also ==
- List of women's studies journals
