= Sociologists for Women in Society =

International organization

Sociologists for Women in Society (SWS) is an international organization of social scientists—students, faculty, practitioners, and researchers—working together to improve the position of women within sociology and society in general.

== History ==
In 1969, several hundred women gathered at a "counter-convention" at Glide Memorial Church rather than attend the ASA meetings at the Hilton Hotel. Sharing feelings of insecurity and stories of initially mystifying experiences as graduate students and faculty, and encouraging each other with applause, they came to see that some of the stresses in being sociologists were not idiosyncratic, but part of the experience of being women. Later that year, some 20 founding women met to build an organization and network. Although SWS was created to redress the plight of women sociologists, SWS has become an organization that also focuses on improving the social position of women in society through feminist sociological research and writing.

SWS holds annual meetings and publishes the academic journal Gender & Society.

== Journal ==
- Gender & Society
