= Alpha Kappa Lambda =

American collegiate social fraternity

- ΑΚΛ
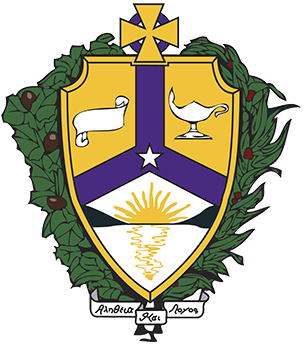
- Founded: April 22, 1914; 112 years ago University of California, Berkeley
- Type: Social
- Affiliation: NIC
- Status: Active
- Scope: National
- Motto: Αλήθεια Και Λόγος; Alethia Kai Logos "The Truth and the Word"
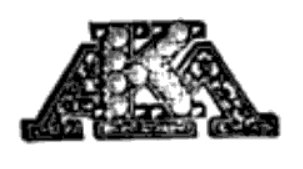
- Member badge
- Colors: Purple and Gold
- Flag
- Flower: Yellow Rose - Souvenir de Claudius Pernet
- Publication: InsideAKL and The Logos
- Philanthropy: These Hands Don't Hurt; Cystic Fibrosis; Adopt a School
- Chapters: 20 active 68 chartered
- Colonies: 2
- Members: 1000+ active 28,000+ lifetime
- Headquarters: 354 Gradle Drive; Carmel, Indiana 46032; United States
- Website: www.akl.org

Alpha Kappa Lambda (ΑΚΛ), commonly known as AKL or Alpha Kapp, is an American collegiate social fraternity founded at the University of California, Berkeley, in 1914. Today, it operates 25 active chapters and has approximately 28,000 living-initiated members.

== History ==
Alpha Kappa Lambda was founded on April 22, 1914, by a group of young men attending the University of California, Berkeley. Its birth, however, dates back to 1906 when a group of friends, the Los Amigos Club, discussed the "need of Christian men for a place to live and study that was within their [financial] means." These eleven men celebrated as the fraternity's founders, were William Barnum, Herman Ritchie Bergh, Charles Junius Booth, Gail Cleland, Leonard Herington Day, Allen Holmes Kimball, Harry Levi Osborne, Charles Oscar Perrine, Ludwig Rehfuess, Harold Alonzo Savage, and Joseph Leon Taylor.

After assisting in the cleanup of the 1906 San Francisco earthquake, four of the group re-addressed their desire to organize a house club during a YMCA conference in Pacific Grove, California. They formed Los Amigos in January 1907, a house club named from the Spanish translation of "The Friends." Shortly after, seven more men joined Los Amigos.

The club adopted its Greek letter name Alpha Kappa Lambda on April 22, 1914. The fraternity contemplated an early expansion program and adjusted its operational model into a more permanent fraternal association model. However, its growth was put on hiatus by World War I. After the war, active members and alumni focused on expansion, establishing Beta chapter at Stanford, followed by chapters at several Midwestern universities. The fraternity joined NIC in 1930.

The Great Depression and World War II disrupted the geographic expansion of the fraternity until 1949 when it hired its first full-time employee. Expansion resumed with an aggressive plan in 1950. Alpha Kappa Lambda became a senior member of NIC in 1954.

The fraternity has eliminated Hell Week, personal duties by pledges, and hazing.

== Symbols ==
Alpha Kappa Lambda is a non-secret order with no pledges of secrecy in the ritual, grips, passwords, or other clandestine signs. Reliance upon honor and the "members' finer feelings [are] depended upon" to safeguard the ritual and meaning of the fraternity.

The official badge of the fraternity is made of ten-carat gold. An Α and a Λ rest in the background, covered with the flowers of a dogwood, representing Christian principles, and a Κ that is raised, set with eleven whole pearls. The pearls represent the eleven founders of the Los Amigos Club. The badge is to be worn only on collared shirts, sweaters, or suit vests, and in the traditional position over the heart. It may only be worn by initiated members of the fraternity. There is also a pledge pin that is a small hollow diamond.

The fraternity's colors are purple and gold. Its motto is Alethia Kai Logos which means "The Truth and the Word" in Classical Greek; the motto's' initials are the same as the fraternity's abbreviated name. Its flower is the yellow rose Souvenir de Claudius Pernet. The fraternity's publications are InsideAKL and The Logos.

== National service projects ==
=== These Hands Don't Hurt ===
These Hands Don't Hurt is the fraternity's response to the sexual assault problem on college campuses and was founded in 1996 by the Beta Zeta chapter at East Tennessee State University. The project fights sexual assault through education, service, and philanthropic fundraising projects. Members fundraise through a "Promise Wall" that is displayed in a high-traffic area of campuses. Students, faculty, and members of the community are asked to add their hand to the Promise Wall for a contribution of $1. By placing their hand on the wall they make a promise that their hand will not be used to harm others. In the spirit of "growing the movement," Alpha Kappa Lambda has allowed other student organizations from around the country to use the program as a way to raise awareness about domestic violence.

=== Cystic Fibrosis ===
The fraternity adopted cystic fibrosis as a national philanthropy at the 1990 National Conclave. Chapter fundraisers provide financial support to local organizations, research, and individuals. Chapters also provide manpower to help local organizations' events.

=== Adopt-A-School ===
The Adopt-A-School program was endorsed by the National Executive Council during a 1994 Winter meeting. The program provides one-on-one relationships between local college students and local elementary students. It allows college students to give something back to their host communities while being positive role models for children.

== Notable members ==
Name	Chapter	Notability	Ref.
Bill Andring	Theta	All century baseball team for U. of Washington. Former professional baseball player.	
David L. Bassett	Beta	Physician and academic	
James Chamberlain Baker	Gamma (hon)	Educator, bishop, organizer, and head of the first Wesley Foundation	
David Booth	Delta	Businessman, and chairman of Dimensional Fund Advisors.	
Jack Cakebread	Alpha	Winemaker and Founder of Cakebread Cellars	
David Cheung	Delta	Educator and pastor and the former member of the Legislative Council of Hong Kong.	
Joe Coulombe	Beta	Founder and former CEO of Trader Joe's	
Ernie Cunliff	Beta	Runner in 1960 Olympics. Stanford Athletics Hall of Fame	
Irving Dilliard	Gamma	Journalist, editor and author.	
Allen Drury	Beta	Journalist and Pulitzer Prize winner	
Alain Entohoven	Beta	American Economist, Rhodes Scholar, Asst. Secretary of Defense	
John P. Gillin	Epsilon	Anthropologist	
Algo Henderson	Delta	Former President of Antioch College, author.	
Bob Herwig	Alpha	Former professional football player and College Football Hall of Fame 1964	
Arthur Hillman ]	Theta	Sociologist, author and educator	
Edward Hoebel	Epsilon	Author and educator	
Hal Holmes Jr.	Gamma	1963 NCAA Tumbling Champion. Member of USA Gymnastics Hall of Fame	
John K. Hester	Gamma	Major General and Commander of 17th Airforce 1964	
Sam S. Kistler	Beta	Inventor of aerogels and educator	
Tim Leavitt	Eta	Mayor of Vancouver, Washington	
Robert Leestamper	Alpha Alpha	Former President of SE Missouri State and Worcester State Universities	
Stanford Lehmberg	Delta	Historian, author, and educator	
Rian Lindell	Eta	Former professional football player	
Neal MacDonald	Alpha Lambda	NCAA Wrestling Champion 1965	
John Henry Manley	Gamma	Physicist, group leader, Manhattan Project	
George C. Martin	Theta	Project engineer on the Boeing B-47 and chief project engineer of the Boeing B-52	
Alvin McCoy	Delta	Journalist of The Kansas City Star who won the Pulitzer Prize	
Lloyd Morey	Gamma	Former President of University of Illinois system	
Stuart A. Queen	Delta (H)	Sociologist and educator	
Carl Rogers	Eta	Psychologist	
Marvin Rosenberry	Epsilon	13th Chief Justice of the Wisconsin Supreme Court	
Eric Schmitt	Xi	U.S. Senator and former Missouri Attorney General	
John Laurence Seymour	Alpha	Composer and playwright	
Mike Shaw	Beta Phi	State Representative, Alabama State House of Representatives	
Henry Shenk	Delta	Former head football coach at University of Kansas and player	
Gary Sherrer	Lambda	45th Lieutenant Governor of Kansas	
John V. Shields	Beta	Businessman and former CEO of Trader Joe's	
Oliver P. Smith	Alpha	U.S. Marine four-star general, decorated combat veteran of World War II and the Korean War	
Charles E. Spahr	Delta	Youngest president, then CEO of Standard Oil of Ohio	
Harold Tascher	Gamma	Author and educator	
David Howard Thorton	Gamma Delta	Actor primarily known for his role as Art the Clown from the Terrifier franchise.	
Mike Uremovich	Kappa	Head Football Coach at Ball State University	
Floyd R. Watson	Gamma (hon)	Engineer, educator, co-founder of Acoustical Society of America	
Eldon Wilcox	Delta	Author	
Edmund Williamson	Gamma	Author and educator	
James Workman	Alpha	Gold Medalist in 1928 Olympics	

== See also ==
- List of social fraternities
