= List of Alpha Kappa Lambda chapters =

Alpha Kappa Lambda is a collegiate social fraternity founded at the University of California, Berkeley in 1914. In the following list of chapters, active chapters are indicated in bold and inactive chapters are in italics.

Chapter	Charter date and range	Institution	Location	Status	Ref.
Alpha	April 22, 1914 – 1970, April 28, 1985 – 1998; April 30, 2016 – 2020	University of California, Berkeley	Berkeley, California	Inactive	(Note: Alpha chapter was formed from the local group, Los Amigos, originally established in 1907. It was reformed as a colony in 1984 and 2011.)
Beta	October 23, 1920 – 1966	Stanford University	Stanford, California	Inactive	
Gamma	March 18, 1921 – 2021	University of Illinois Urbana-Champaign	Champaign and Urbana, Illinois	Inactive	(Note: Gamma chapter was formed by absorbing the local group, Bushnell Guild, which was established in 1918.)
**Delta**	June 2, 1922 – 1934, 1947–2005; September 18, 2010	University of Kansas	Lawrence, Kansas	Active	(Note: Delta chapter was formed by absorbing the local group, Ochino Club, which was established in 1919. It was re-established as a colony in 1947 and 2007.)
Epsilon	May 4, 1923 – 1934, 1847–2005, 2010	University of Wisconsin–Madison	Madison, Wisconsin	Inactive	
Zeta	February 9, 1924 – 1941, 1961–1970	University of Michigan	Ann Arbor, Michigan	Inactive	(Note: Zeta chapter was formed by absorbing the local group, Cygnus, established in 1921. It was reformed as a colony in 1958.)
Eta	October 15, 1927 – 1943, 1946–200x ?, 2010–2017	Washington State University	Pullman, Washington	Inactive	(Note: Eta chapter was formed by absorbing the local group, Diversity Club, which was established in 1924. It was reformed as a colony in 1946 and 2008.)
Theta	April 27, 1929 – 1936; 1949–1952; 1954–1968; October 26, 1991 – 1998	University of Washington	Seattle, Washington	Inactive	(Note: Theta chapter was established as a colony in 1929 and reformed as a colony in 1948, 1953, and 1989.)
Iota	May 24, 1930 – 1943; 1946–1995; February 27, 2015 – 2019	Kansas State University	Manhattan, Kansas	Inactive	(Note: Iota chapter was formed by absorbing the local group, Delta Nu Omega, which was established in 1928. It reformed as a colony in 1946 and 2013.)
Kappa	May 20, 1934 – 2018	Purdue University	West Lafayette, Indiana	Inactive	(Note: Kappa chapter was formed by absorbing the local group Cimarron, established in 1931.)
Lambda	March 27, 1949 – 1972; April 11, 2008 – 2022	Emporia State University	Emporia, Kansas	Inactive	(Note: Lambda chapter was formed by absorbing the local group, Los Amigos Guild, which was established in 1948. It was reformed as a colony in 2006.)
Mu	May 21, 1950 – 1972; May 19, 1990 – 1994; October 19, 2018 – 2022	Ohio State University	Columbus, Ohio	Inactive	(Note: Mu colony was formed by absorbing the local group, Omega Xi, which was established in 1948. It was reformed as a colony in 1988 and 2015.)
Nu	October 14, 1951 – 1955	Ohio University	Athens, Ohio	Inactive	(Note: Nu chapter was formed by absorbing the local group, Beta Sigma, which was established in 1949.)
**Xi**	April 26, 1953	Truman State University	Kirksville, Missouri	Active	(Note: Xi chapter was formed by absorbing AKL Club, originally established in 1952.)
Omicron	May 15, 1955 – 2003	University of the Pacific	Stockton, California	Inactive	(Note: Omicron chapter was formed from AKL Club, originally established in 1954.)
Pi	October 30, 1955 – 1966	Millikin University	Decatur, Illinois	Inactive	(Note: Pi chapter was formed by absorbing the local group, Sigma Phi Alpha which was originally established in 1953.)
Rho	March 24, 1957 – 1980	Eastern Illinois University	Charleston, Illinois	Inactive	(Note: Rho chapter was formed by absorbing AKL Club, originally established in 1956.)
**Sigma**	April 7, 1957 – 2006; April 7, 2014	University of Central Missouri	Warrensburg, Missouri	Active	(Note: Sigma chapter was formed by absorbing the local group, Beta Chi Sigma, which was established in 1955. It reformed as a colony in 2010.)
**Tau**	April 28, 1957	Pennsylvania State University	University Park, Pennsylvania	Active	(Note: Tau chapter was formed by absorbing the local group, Sigma Phi Alpha, which was established in 1926.)
Upsilon	May 12, 1957 – 1971; April 16, 1999 – 2020	University of Northern Colorado	Greeley, Colorado	Inactive	(Note: Upsilon chapter was formed as a colony in 1955. It reformed as a colony in 1997.)
Phi	January 25, 1958 – 1994	Oregon State University	Corvallis, Oregon	Inactive	
**Chi**	April 9, 1960 – 1998; April 9, 2006	PennWest California	California, Pennsylvania	Active	(Note: Chi chapter was formed by absorbing the local group, Pi Delta Chi, which was established in 1959. It reformed as a colony in 2003.)
**Psi**	February 11, 1961	Iowa State University	Ames, Iowa	Active	
Alpha Alpha	September 30, 1961 – 1973	New Mexico State University	Las Cruces, New Mexico	Inactive	
Alpha Beta	October 1, 1961 – 1985, 1987–1997	University of Arizona	Tucson, Arizona	Inactive	(Note: Alpha Beta chapter was formed by absorbing the local group, Southgate Hall, which was established in 1959. It reformed as a colony in 1986.)
Alpha Gamma	May 5, 1962 – 1985; 1987–1997	University of Wisconsin–La Crosse	La Crosse, Wisconsin	Inactive	(Note: Alpha Gamma chapter was formed by absorbing the local Phi Kappa Epsilon, which was established in 1935.)
Alpha Delta	May 13, 1962 – 1989	Fort Hays State University	Hays, Kansas	Inactive	(Note: Alpha Delta chapter was formed by absorbing the local Kappa Sigma Kappa, which was established in 1929.)
Alpha Epsilon	March 9, 1963 – 1974	University of Wisconsin–Oshkosh	Oshkosh, Wisconsin	Inactive	(Note: Alpha Epsilon chapter was formed by absorbing the local group, Philakaen, which was established in 1899.)
**Alpha Zeta**	April 27, 1963	Northwest Missouri State University	Maryville, Missouri	Active	
Alpha Eta	May 11, 1963	McNeese State University	Lake Charles, Louisiana	Inactive	
Alpha Theta	November 23, 1963 – 1985; 1987–2002	University of Wisconsin–Eau Claire	Eau Claire, Wisconsin	Inactive	
Alpha Iota	May 23, 1964 – 1974	University of Wyoming	Laramie, Wyoming	Inactive	
Alpha Kappa	October 4, 1964 – 1974	Colorado State University	Fort Collins, Colorado	Inactive	(Note: Alpha Kappa chapter was formed by absorbing the local group, Alethians, which was established in 1963.)
Alpha Lambda	November 14, 1964 – 1972; April 11, 1992 – 1996; November 8, 2003 – 2022	Northern Illinois University	DeKalb, Illinois	Inactive	(Note: Alpha Lambda chapter was formed by absorbing the local Phi Delta Sigma, which was established in 1963.)
Alpha Mu	December 12, 1964 – 1985; January 27, 1996 – 2004	University of Arkansas	Fayetteville, Arkansas	Inactive	
Alpha Nu	February 14, 1965 – 1972; 1980–1985	Washburn University	Topeka, Kansas	Inactive	(Note: Alpha Nu chapter was formed by absorbing the local group, Intrepid, which was established in 1963.)
Alpha Xi	May 14, 1966 – 1971	University of Montana	Missoula, Montana	Inactive	
**Alpha Omicron**	February 11, 1967 – 1971; April 6, 2019	University of Colorado Boulder	Boulder, Colorado	Active	
Alpha Pi	February 18, 1967 – 1971; 1994–1998	University of Texas at Austin	Austin, Texas	Inactive	(Note: Alpha Pi chapter was formed by absorbing the local Sigma Theta, which was established in 1965. It reformed as a colony in 1993.)
**Alpha Rho**	November 19, 1967 – 1972; November 19, 1994	University of Texas at El Paso	El Paso, Texas	Active	
Alpha Sigma	March 2, 1968 – 1974	University of New Mexico	Albuquerque, New Mexico	Inactive	
Alpha Tau	April 20, 1968 – 1973	Alliance College	Cambridge Springs, Pennsylvania	Inactive	
Alpha Upsilon	April 21, 1968 – 1980	Nebraska Wesleyan University	Lincoln, Nebraska	Inactive	(Note: Alpha Upsilon chapter was formed by absorbing the local Phi Sigma Rho, which was established in 1966.)
**Alpha Phi**	May 11, 1968 – 1978; April 25, 1992	University of Idaho	Moscow, Idaho	Active	
Alpha Chi	December 14, 1968 – 1974	Pittsburg State University	Pittsburg, Kansas	Inactive	(Note: Alpha Chi chapter was formed by absorbing the local Delta Kappa Sigma, which was established in 1967.)
Alpha Psi	May 25, 1969 – 1979	University of Tennessee	Knoxville, Tennessee	Inactive	
Beta Alpha	May 31, 1969 – 1984	Loyola University Chicago	Chicago Illinois	Inactive	
Beta Beta	January 11, 1970 – 1973	University of Utah	Salt Lake City, Utah	Inactive	
Beta Gamma	February 21, 1970 – 1981	Sul Ross State University	Alpine, Texas	Inactive	
Beta Delta	March 7, 1970 – 1995	Illinois State University	Normal, Illinois	Inactive	
Beta Epsilon	March 9, 1970 – 1972	University of Nebraska at Kearney	Kearney, Nebraska	Inactive	(Note: Beta Epsilon chapter formed by absorbing the local Tau Rho, which was established in 1968.)
Beta Zeta	May 9, 1970 – 1978; March 22, 1997 – 2005	East Tennessee State University	Johnson City, Tennessee	Inactive	
Beta Eta	December 11, 1971 – 1975	Westmar University	Le Mars, Iowa	Inactive	
Beta Theta	April 29, 1972 – 1979	Angelo State University	San Angelo, Texas	Inactive	
Beta Iota	May 13, 1972	Wichita State University	Wichita, Kansas	Inactive	(Note: Beta Iota chapter was formed by absorbing the local Sigma Chi Sigma, which was established in 1967.)
Beta Kappa	February 24, 1973 – 1983	Southern Illinois University Carbondale	Carbondale, Illinois	Inactive	
Beta Lambda	March 10, 1973 – 1975	University of Wisconsin–Parkside	Kenosha, Wisconsin	Inactive	
Beta Mu	November 12, 1983 – 1985	Winona State University	Winona, Minnesota	Inactive	
Beta Nu	September 14, 1985 – 2019	Virginia Commonwealth University	Richmond, Virginia	Inactive	
Beta Omicron	November 21, 1987 – 2013	James Madison University	Harrisonburg, Virginia	Inactive	
Beta Pi	January 1, 1988 – 1998	University of Southern Indiana	Evansville, Indiana	Inactive	(Note: Beta Pi colony was formed by absorbing the local Alpha Omega Pi, which was established in 1972.)
Beta Rho	April 15, 1989 – 1995	Elon College	Elon, North Carolina	Inactive	
Beta Sigma	April 29, 1989 – 1991	Northwood University	Midland, Michigan	Inactive	
**Beta Tau**	May 20, 1989	Southern Illinois University Edwardsville	Edwardsville, Illinois	Active	(Note: Beta Tau chapter was formed by absorbing the local Psi Kappa Zeta, which was established in 1987.)
Beta Upsilon	May 14, 1990 – 2007	University of Iowa	Iowa City, Iowa	Inactive	
Beta Phi	December 8, 1990 – 1998; 2008–2014	Auburn University	Auburn, Alabama	Inactive	
Beta Chi	May 9, 1992 – 1998; April 24, 2010 – 2020	George Mason University	Fairfax, Virginia	Inactive	
Beta Psi	September 12, 1992 – 2022	Missouri State University	Springfield, Missouri	Inactive	
**Gamma Alpha**	November 7, 1992 – 2010; 2015	University of Missouri	Columbia, Missouri	Active	
**Gamma Beta**	October 23, 1993	University of Alabama	Tuscaloosa, Alabama	Active	
Gamma Gamma	April 1, 1995 – 2015; December 7, 2018 – 2024	Rutgers University–New Brunswick	New Brunswick, New Jersey	Inactive	
**Gamma Delta**	November 3, 1995	University of Montevallo	Montevallo, Alabama	Active	
Gamma Epsilon	November 18, 1995 – 2002	Mississippi State University	Starkville, Mississippi	Inactive	
Gamma Zeta	November 9, 1995 – 2010	University of Georgia	Athens, Georgia	Inactive	(Note: Gamma Zeta chapter was formed by absorbing the local group, Aristocrats, which was established in 1994.)
Gamma Eta	March 14, 1998 – 2005	University of Central Arkansas	Conway, Arkansas	Inactive	
Gamma Theta	March 15, 2003 – 2023	Boise State University	Boise, Idaho	Inactive	
Gamma Iota	November 22, 2004 – 2019	Eastern Michigan University	Ypsilanti, Michigan	Inactive	
Gamma Kappa	May 20, 2006 – 2021	Fairleigh Dickinson University	Florham Park, New Jersey	Inactive	
**Gamma Lambda**	November 17, 2007	Temple University	Philadelphia, Pennsylvania	Active	
Gamma Mu	April 12, 2008 – 2019	PennWest Edinboro	Edinboro, Pennsylvania	Inactive	
Gamma Nu	April 23, 2010 – 2020	Mansfield University of Pennsylvania	Mansfield, Pennsylvania	Inactive	
Gamma Xi	April 25, 2010 – 2022	Clayton State University	Morrow, Georgia	Inactive	
**Gamma Omicron**	April 8, 2014	Dalton State College	Dalton, Georgia	Active	
**Gamma Pi**	March 28, 2015	University of Connecticut	Storrs, Connecticut	Active	
**Gamma Rho**	July 30, 2016	Arizona State University	Tempe, Arizona	Active	
**Gamma Sigma**	February 17, 2017	Old Dominion University	Norfolk, Virginia	Active	
**Gamma Tau**	September 29, 2017	Indiana University Bloomington	Bloomington, Indiana	Active	
Gamma Upsilon	March 16, 2018 – 2022	Saginaw Valley State University	University Center, Michigan	Inactive	
Provisional Chapter	1999-2002	Arkansas Tech University	Russellville, Arkansas	Inactive	
Provisional Chapter	January 21, 1919 –202x ?	University of Nevada, Reno	Reno, Nevada	Inactive	
Provisional Chapter	2019–202x ?	University of Virginia	Charlottesville, Virginia	Inactive	
**Provisional Chapter**		Kutztown University of Pennsylvania	Kutztown, Pennsylvania	Active	
**Provisional Chapter**	March 26, 2024	University of Mississippi	Oxford, Mississippi	Active	
