= John V. Shields =

American businessman (1932–2014)

John V. Shields Jr.
- Born: March 23, 1932; Illinois, U.S.
- Died: October 31, 2014 (aged 82)
- Occupation: CEO of Trader Joe's
- Children: 4

John V. Shields Jr. (March 23, 1932 – October 31, 2014) was an American businessman who was the CEO of the American grocery store chain Trader Joe's from 1988 to 2001. Shields was voted the Master Entrepreneur of the Los Angeles Area in 1993.

== Early life ==
Shields was born on March 23, 1932, in Illinois. He attended Serra High School in San Mateo, California and graduated in 1950. In 1954, he earned a BA degree in European from Stanford University, followed in 1956 by an MBA from the same place. He was a member of Alpha Kappa Lambda fraternity at Stanford.

Shields also served in the military for two years.

== Career ==
Shields joined Macy's California, a department store chain, in their executive training program, rising to the position of Vice President of Operations.

In 1979 Shields left Macy's to join Mervyn's Department Stores to help in their national expansion program. In the nine years he was with them, Mervyn's expanded from 36 to 175 stores.

His retirement from Mervyn's in 1987 lasted for five weeks. John was approached by an old friend from Stanford days who had founded the Trader Joe's grocery stores, Joe Coulombe. What was started out a consulting assignment led to Shields becoming CEO of Trader Joe's a year later, when Coulombe decided to retire. During Shield's tenure TJ's grew from 27 stores to 174 stores, and from $132 million to $2 billion in sales. He retired from TJ's in 2001.

== Personal ==
Shields had two sons and two daughters. He lived in Thousand Oaks, California and died on October 31, 2014, aged 82.

Business positions
Preceded by Joe Coulombe	CEO of Trader Joe's; 1987 – 2001	Succeeded by Dan Bane
