= Pirate Joe's =

Store that resold Trader Joe's products in Canada

- Logo used prior to lawsuits
- Type: Grocery store
- Founded: 2012
- Defunct: 2017
- Headquarters: Vancouver, British Columbia, Canada
- Owner: Michael Hallatt

Pirate Joe's was a specialty grocery store in Vancouver, British Columbia, Canada, owned by Michael Hallatt. Its inventory consisted entirely of store brand products resold from locations of the U.S.-based grocery chain Trader Joe's, which does not operate any locations in Canada. Despite the high costs of operating the store because of its business model, the store became popular with residents who enjoyed the opportunity to purchase some of the distinct private label products offered by Trader Joe's.

Although considered a legal grey market business, Hallatt's operation drew the ire of the Trader Joe's company. The shop eventually became the subject of a lawsuit filed by Trader Joe's in May 2013, which claimed that the Pirate Joe's shop was infringing on its trademarks and damaging its reputation. Hallatt chose to fight for his business model in court while continuing to operate the store. In 2013, a judge dismissed the suit, ruling that Hallatt could not be convicted under US trademark law because the alleged infringements did not occur within the country. Trader Joe's was not able to prove the business was causing them any harm, and it was determined that they were in fact benefiting since all products were purchased from their stores at full retail price, although it ended up being a Pyrrhic victory. The suit was later reopened on appeal, and Hallatt finally decided to close the store in 2017 due to mounting legal costs.

== History ==
While living in the San Francisco Bay Area as an employee of Ask.com, Michael Hallatt had become fond of the unique store brand products carried by the California-based grocery store chain Trader Joe's, which did not operate any locations in Canada. After returning to his hometown of Vancouver, Hallatt decided to open a store which would resell Trader Joe's' products. First established in January 2012 under the name "Transilvania Trading", the shop moved to a new location in Vancouver's Kitsilano neighbourhood under the name "Pirate Joe's" later in the year.

To facilitate his business model, Hallatt made weekly trips to Trader Joe's stores in nearby Washington (particularly Bellingham) with an unmarked van to purchase products, spending $4000 to $5000 on each trip. He then brought the products back to Vancouver, and sold them at Pirate Joe's on a grey market basis with markups between $2–3 per product. The store stocked around 1,000 products, and did not carry any fresh or frozen food products. Although popular with residents, Hallatt stated that the store "barely" made enough money to remain operational due to its expenses, which alongside rent and salaries, also included the cost of his trips into the United States to acquire inventory.

== Opposition ==
Although he had spent an estimated $350,000 at the American grocery store since he established Pirate Joe's, Trader Joe's eventually began to show resistance to Hallatt's operation. Hallatt found himself banned from various Trader Joe's locations (with his photo also distributed to other locations as a warning), requiring him to venture farther south to locations in Seattle and even Los Angeles in order to obtain products for his inventory without being recognized. On one occasion, Hallatt tried to disguise himself by cross-dressing, but a bystander in a nearby store's parking lot mistook him for a robber, and called the police.

In May 2013, Trader Joe's filed a lawsuit against Hallatt in the state of Washington, alleging trademark infringement, unfair competition, false designation of origin, and false advertising. The lawsuit claimed that the Pirate Joe's store was arranged too similarly to an actual Trader Joe's store, and that the store's "prominent display of Trader Joe's trademarks and other intellectual property and their flagrant attempts to pass themselves off as an approved retailer of Trader Joe's-brand products convey the false impression that the defendants' retail store is affiliated with and/or endorsed by Trader Joe's." Trader Joe's submitted an application for a trademark on its name in Canada in 2010, but, as of 2013, it had not been granted. Hallatt pledged to continue operating the store (but with newly hired staff members filling his previous role of purchasing inventory), as he believed he was legally able to sell the products he obtained. After the lawsuit was filed, he began marketing the shop as being "Unauthorized, Unaffiliated and Unafraid", and modified the store's window sign to read "Irate Joe's".

Intellectual property lawyer Greg Owen argued that Trader Joe's had no chance of winning the lawsuit unless the store was actually located in the United States or the lawsuit was filed in Canada, and also noted that the company was "certainly benefiting from Hallatt purchasing the products." Law professors Kal Raustiala and Chris Sprigman also believed that Trader Joe's attempt to sue its "best customer" would be unsuccessful, arguing that there would be no consumer confusion between Pirate Joe's and an official Trader Joe's shop due to their dissimilar designs, the first-sale doctrine could also apply in large-scale reselling operations like Pirate Joe's, and that Trader Joe's inaccurate interpretation of trademark law would effectively ban the sale of any used goods by retailers.

=== Dismissal and appeal ===
In October 2013, Judge Marsha Pechman dismissed the case, ruling that Trader Joe's did not provide sufficient evidence of any economic harm caused by the operation, and that Hallatt could not be held liable under the Lanham Act because the alleged trademark infringements did not occur within the United States.

In August 2016, the dismissal was overturned by the 9th U.S. Circuit Court of Appeals, which ruled that a U.S. court does have authority to hear the case, sending the case back to the district court.

On June 8, 2017, Pirate Joe's announced that it was closing its doors because the ongoing lawsuit was simply too expensive.

== Related ventures ==
After the lawsuit was dismissed in 2013, Hallatt announced his "plans" to open a fast food restaurant in Vancouver, with a goal to "revisit fast food" and use "fresh, organic, sustainably harvested ingredients" to produce a healthier hamburger.
