= George C. Martin =

- Born: May 16, 1910; Everett, Washington
- Died: May 21, 2003 (aged 93); Seattle, Washington
- Occupation: Aeronautical project engineer
- Employer: The Boeing Company
- Title: Vice president of engineering
- Spouse: Mary Martin
- Children: Marian Martin; Edith Martin Shreeve

George Coleman Martin (May 16, 1910, Everett, Washington - May 21, 2003) was a project engineer on the Boeing B-47 and chief project engineer of the Boeing B-52.

== Education ==
After graduating from Everett High School, Martin enrolled at the University of Washington in Seattle, where he majored in aeronautical engineering. While a student at Washington, he was inducted into the Tau Beta Pi engineering honor society, and became a brother of the Alpha Kappa Lambda social fraternity. He graduated from Washington in 1931.
