= Jack Cakebread =

American winemaker (1929–2022)

Jack Cakebread (1929 – April 26, 2022) was an American winemaker. He founded Cakebread Cellars in 1973.
