= Joe Coulombe =

American businessman (1930–2020)

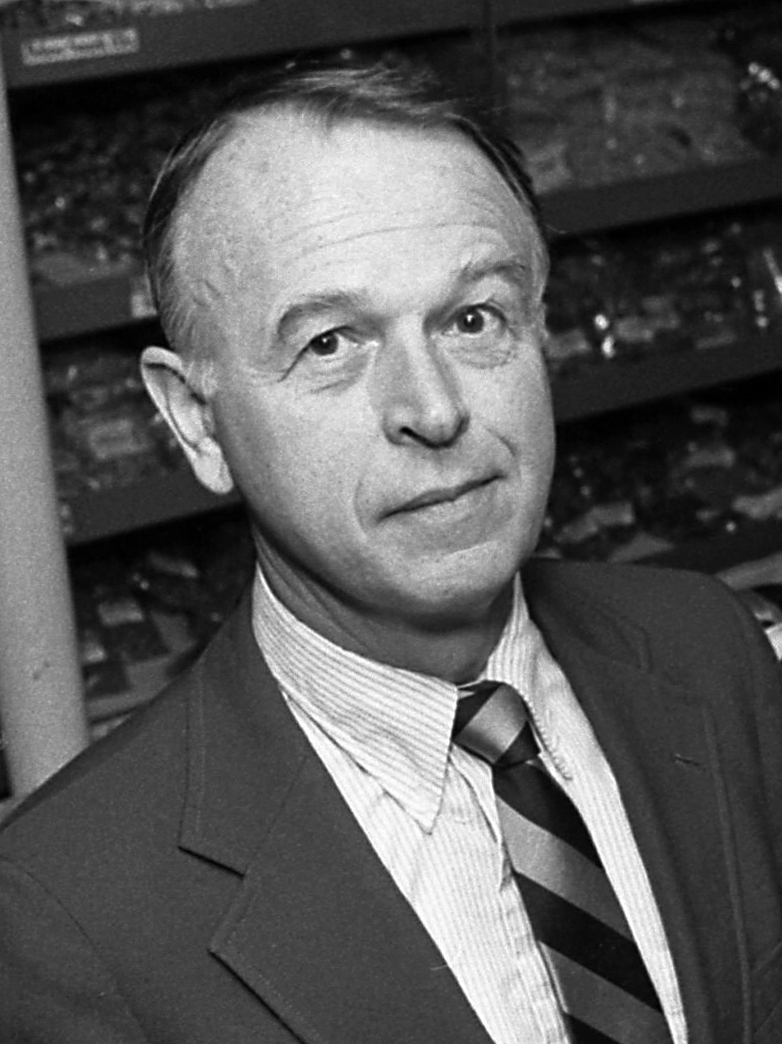
- Coulombe in 1986
- Born: Joseph Hardin Coulombe; June 3, 1930; San Diego, California, U.S.
- Died: February 28, 2020 (aged 89); Pasadena, California, U.S.
- Education: Stanford University (BA, MBA)
- Occupation: Entrepreneur
- Known for: Founder and CEO of Trader Joe's
- Spouse: Alice Steere (m. 1952)
- Children: 3

Joseph Hardin Coulombe (June 3, 1930 – February 28, 2020) was an American entrepreneur who founded the grocery store chain Trader Joe's in 1967 and served as its CEO until his retirement in 1988.

== Early life and education ==
Coulombe was born in San Diego, California, and grew up on an avocado farm in nearby Del Mar. After serving a year in the U.S. Air Force, he attended Stanford University, where he earned a bachelor's degree in economics in 1952 and a Master of Business Administration degree in 1954. Coulombe was a member of Alpha Kappa Lambda.

== Career ==
Coulombe started his career at Rexall, a chain of American drugstores. In 1958, he was asked to test the launch of Pronto Markets, a store brand to compete against 7-Eleven. After running six Pronto Markets in the Los Angeles area, Rexall asked Coulombe to liquidate them; he decided to buy them out instead. In 1967, Coulombe changed the name Pronto Markets to Trader Joe's. He led the chain to success and sold it in 1979 to German billionaire Theo Albrecht, co-founder of the Aldi supermarket chain. Coulombe continued with Trader Joe's as chief executive officer until retiring in 1988.

Coulombe served on the corporate boards of Cost Plus World Market, Bristol Farms, True Religion, and Imperial Bank.

== Personal life and death ==
In 1952, Coulombe married Alice Steere, whom he met at a party while they were students at Stanford. Alice served on the board and was a life trustee of the Los Angeles Opera. They had three children, Joe, Charlotte, and Madeleine. Coulombe and his family lived in Pasadena, California.

Coulombe was a board member of the Huntington Library, the Colburn School, and the Los Angeles Opera.

On February 28, 2020, Coulombe died at his home in Pasadena, at age 89.

In 2021, his memoir was published: Becoming Trader Joe: How I Did Business My Way and Still Beat the Big Guys.
