= John P. Gillin =

American anthropologist

John P. Gillin, Professor of Anthropology at University of Pittsburgh

John Philip GIllin (1907–1973) was an American anthropologist and scholar who made substantial contributions to the field of anthropology. He exhibited a great interest in Latin American culture and took many trips to South America.

John P. Gillin was the only child of a well-known sociology professor John Lewis Gillin. John P. Gillin received a bachelor's degree and a master's degree from the University of Wisconsin. His coursework included sociology, psychology, and anthropology. For further graduate level studies, Gillin pursued master's degrees and a PhD at Harvard University. Early in his academic career, Gillin took an interest in the social behavior of men. He started anthropological research during an expedition to British Guiana.

Over his career, Gillin held numerous appointments as a professor. Some of his college or university appointments include Sarah Lawrence College, University of Utah, Ohio State University, Duke University, University of North Carolina at Chapel Hill, and the University of Pittsburgh.

== Work ==
Gillin performed extensive research on cultures in South America. He sought to identify how environmental conditions played a role in the formation of modern culture. Gillin believed it was evident that the environment would influence culture based on how people adjusted to the environment.

In the early 1930s, Gillin knew the cultures of South America were unknown to most North Americans. In order to help improve his own knowledge of South American culture and other North Americans, Gillin undertook multiple expeditions to South America. His objective was to research the culture and study the physical anthropology of the area.

In 1933, Gillin taught at Sarah Lawrence College while continuing his anthropological studies. In 1935, Gillin worked as an assistant professor of anthropology at the University of Utah. During his tenure, he spearheaded expeditions around Utah to study ecological features and the impact on early humans. From 1937 to 1941, Gillin taught anthropology at Ohio State University. From 1942 to 1946, Gillin taught anthropology at Duke University. From 1946 to 1959, Gillin taught at the University of North Carolina Chapel Hill. From 1959 until 1972, Gillin taught at the University of Pittsburgh. At the University of Pittsburgh, Gillin was Dean of the Social Sciences and founded its Department of Anthropology.

Over the course of his academic teaching positions, Gillin continued fieldwork among Latin American culture. Gillin was primarily interested in native or Indian cultures. He applied his research on early humans and environments in South America to develop models for understanding modern Latin American culture. Some of the indigenous cultures he studied include Ladinos of Guatemala, Guatemalan Indians that are descendants of the Maya civilization, Apache, people of the Imbabura province in Ecuador, and Creole Peruvian culture. Gillin believed that the study of other cultures would improve understanding of human behavior and, as a result, facilitate peace.
