= David Cheung =

Hong Kong politician (1937–2013)

David Cheung Chi-kong JP
- 張子江

Member of the Legislative Council
- In office 12 October 1988 – 22 August 1991
- Appointed by: Sir David Wilson

Personal details
- Born: 21 July 1937 Hong Kong
- Died: 16 September 2013 (aged 77) St. Louis, Missouri, United States
- Citizenship: Hong Kong
- Spouse: Marjorie
- Children: Kevin, Karen and Kerry
- Education: Wah Yan College; New Method College; Hong Kong Baptist College; University of Kansas (MSc); Covenant Theological Seminary (MRE)
- Occupation: School principal

David Cheung Chi-kong, JP (21 July 1937 – 16 September 2013) was a Hong Kong educator and pastor and the former member of the Legislative Council of Hong Kong.

David Cheung studied in the Wah Yan College, Kowloon, New Method College, and Hong Kong Baptist College (today's Baptist University). He continued his study in Education Administration at the University of Kansas.

He was appointed to the Legislative Council by Governor David Wilson in 1988, since the Teaching functional constituency was occupied by the grassroots educator Szeto Wah, the elite had to be co-opted through the appointment system to balance its interest in the Legislative Council.

David Cheung was the advocate of the mother-tongue education. The teaching language in the Carmel Secondary School, where he was the principal of, was shifted from English to Cantonese Chinese in accordance of the recommendation of the Department of Education in 1987. He later resigned as he became aware of the difficulty in going against the stream.

Cheung later moved to St. Louis, Missouri, United States where he lived until his death.
