= Stuart A. Queen =

American university teacher (1890–1987)

Stuart Alfred Queen (February 26, 1890 – September 28, 1987) was an American sociologist and the 31st President of the American Sociological Association (for the year 1941).

== Biography ==
Queen studied at Pomona College in California, where he received his bachelor's degree in 1910. He did his master's degree at the University of Chicago, where he studied under George Elliott Howard. In Chicago he also received his Ph.D. Queen took several breaks from his studies and teaching career to work for charities. From 1920 to 1922 he lectured at the Simmons College. 1922 to 1930 he was a sociology professor at the University of Kansas. From 1932 until his retirement he was a professor at the University of Washington. He was elected to the position of the President of the American Sociological Association in 1941.

Queen's main scientific concern was the utilization of sociological knowledge for social work.

== Works ==
- The Passing of the County jail. George Banta Publishing Company, Menasha (Wisconsin) 1920.
- Social work in the light of history. JB Lippincott company, Philadelphia and London 1922.
- Social Pathology. Thomas Y Crowell, New York 1925.
- The City (with William Isaac Thomas ), McGraw-Hill, New York 1939.
- The American social system. Houghton Mifflin, Boston 1956.
