= Trader Joe's =

US grocery store chain

Trader Joe's Company

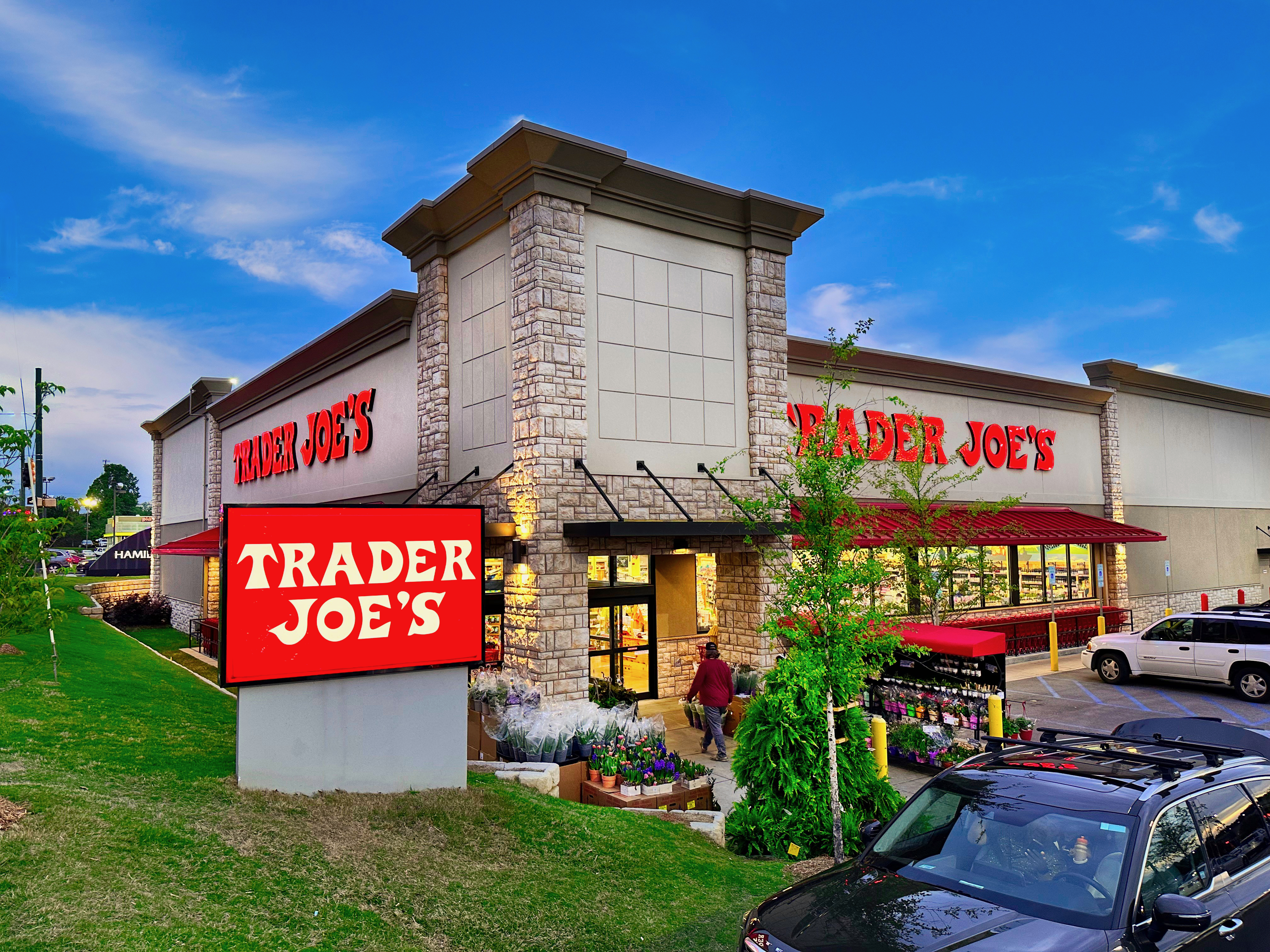
- Trader Joe's in Chattanooga, Tennessee
- Trade name: Trader Joe's
- Type: Private
- Industry: Retail (grocery)
- Founded: 1958; 68 years ago as Pronto Markets; 1967; 59 years ago as Trader Joe's; Pasadena, California, U.S.
- Founder: Joe Coulombe
- Headquarters: 800 S. Shamrock Avenue; Monrovia, California
- Number of locations: 662
- Area served: Contiguous United States
- Key people: Bryan Palbaum (chairman & CEO)
- Products: Private label staple foods, organic foods and specialty products
- Revenue: ▲US$20 billion (FY 2023)
- Owner: Aldi Nord
- Number of employees: 50,000+
- Website: www.traderjoes.com

Trader Joe's Company is an American grocery store chain headquartered in Monrovia, California, U.S. with 662 locations around the United States as of November 16, 2026.

The first Trader Joe's store was opened in 1967 by founder Joe Coulombe in Pasadena, California. Theo Albrecht, the co-founder of Aldi, bought the chain in 1979. Today, its ownership is structured so Aldi Nord is a sister company, with Albrecht's son, Theo Albrecht Jr. owning both. The company has offices in Monrovia and Boston, Massachusetts.

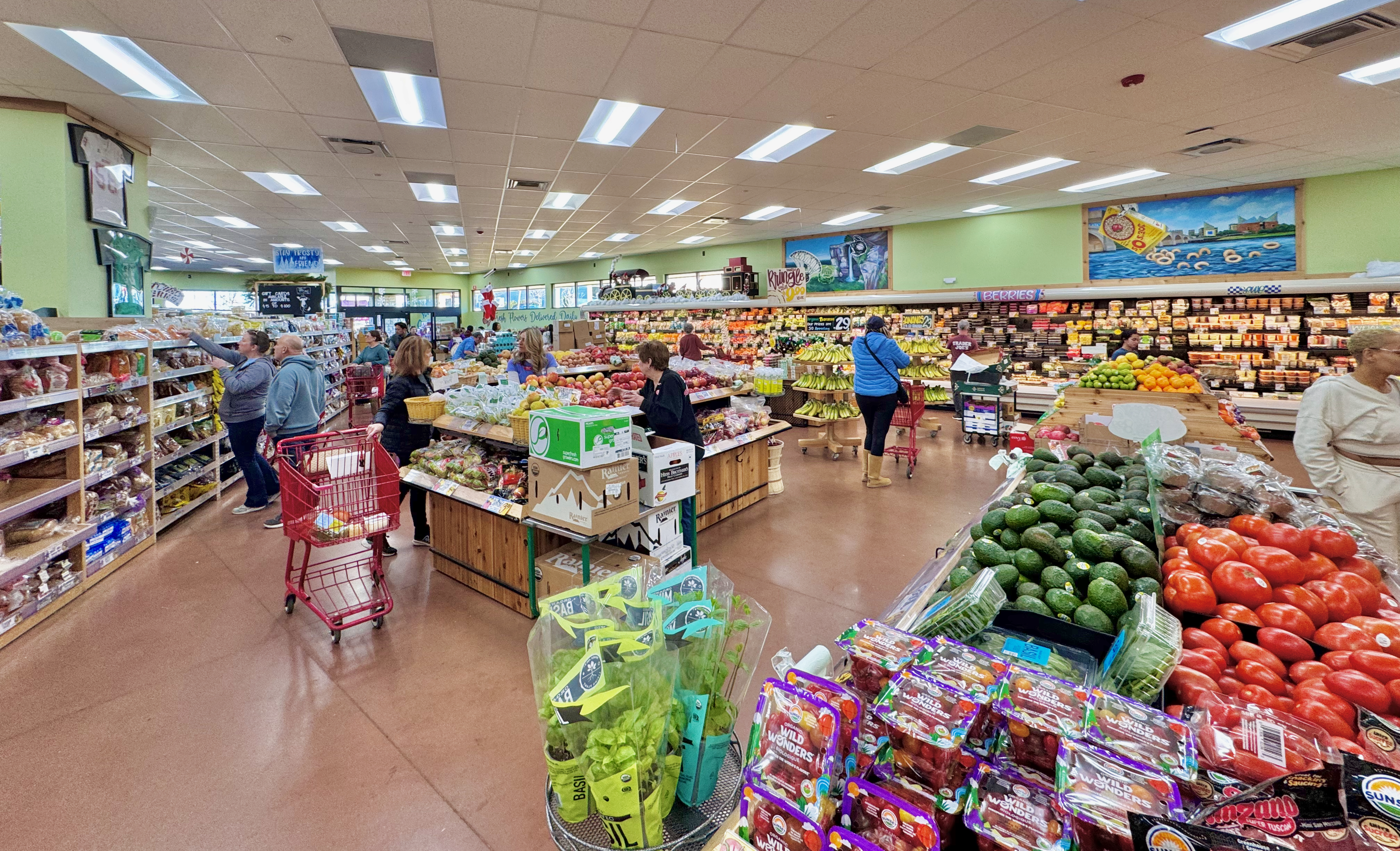
Interior of a typical Trader Joe's store

== History ==
Trader Joe's is named after its founder, Joe Coulombe. The company began in 1958 as a Greater Los Angeles area chain known as Pronto Market convenience stores, originally a subsidiary of Rexall unit Owl Drug. Coulombe believed that the original Pronto Markets were too similar to 7-Eleven, which he described as the "800-pound gorilla of convenience stores", and was concerned that the competition would be too heavy.

Coulombe developed the idea of the Trader Joe's South Seas motif while on vacation in the Caribbean. During the 1960s, the Tiki culture craze was still widespread in the United States, so in a direct nod to the fad, the Trader Joe's name itself was a spoof on Trader Vic's, the famous tiki-themed restaurant that had opened its first southern California location in the Beverly Hilton in 1955. Dining at Trader Vic's in Beverly Hills was notoriously expensive, but the Trader Joe's in Pasadena provided an irreverent and more affordable offering of food and drink. Coulombe noted two trends in the US that informed the merchandising of his new store concept: one, the number of college-educated people was rising steadily, partly due to the G.I. Bill, and two, with new jumbo jets due to premiere in 1970, international travel would be accelerating as well. A better-educated, more well-traveled public was acquiring tastes they had trouble satisfying in American supermarkets at the time.

The first store branded as "Trader Joe's" opened in 1967 in Pasadena, California; it remains in operation. In their first few decades, some of the stores offered fresh meats provided by butchers who leased space in the stores, along with sandwiches and freshly cut cheese, all in-store.

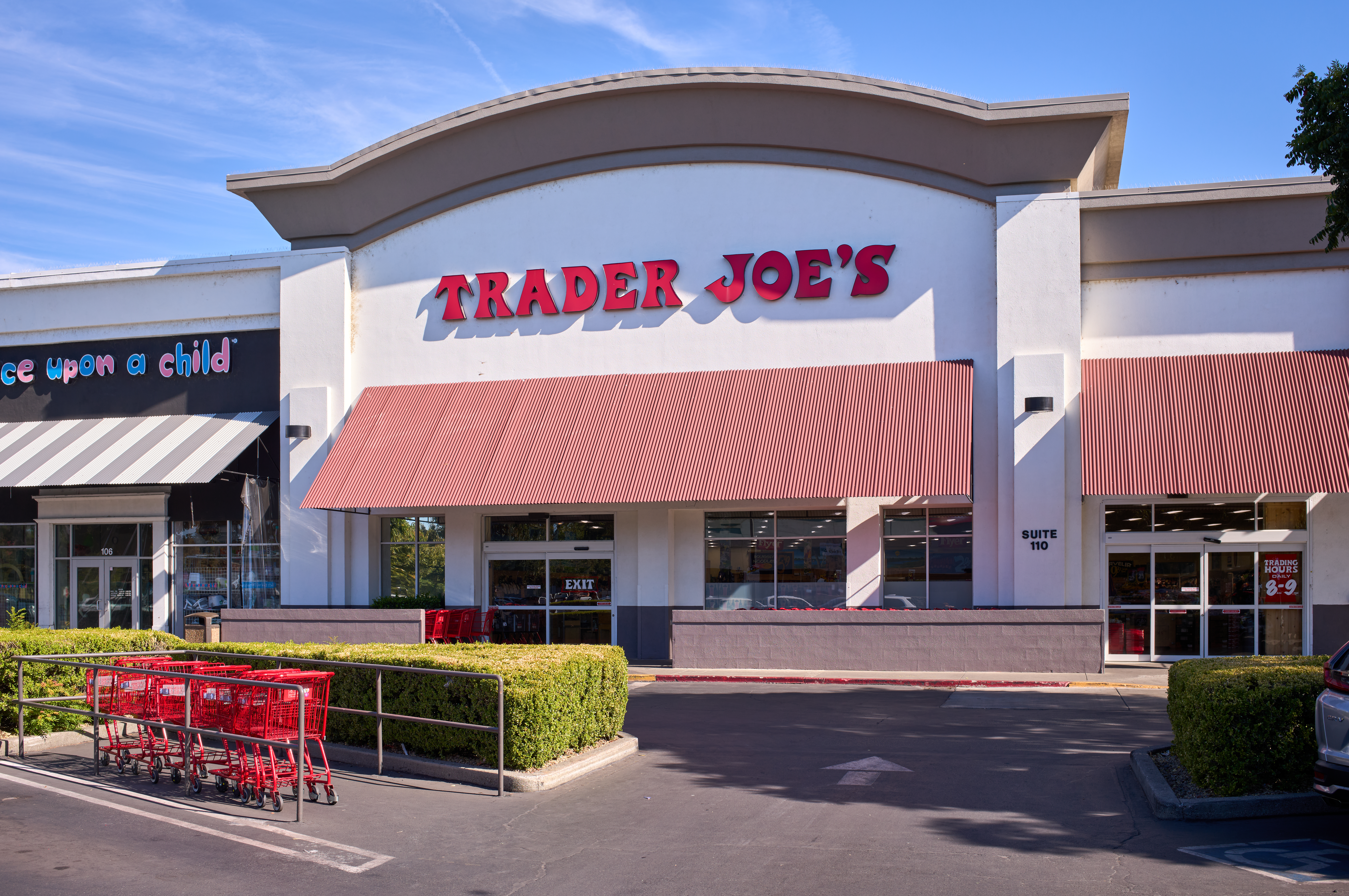
Store in Chico, California (2026)

In 1979, owner and CEO of Aldi Nord Theo Albrecht bought the company. Joe Coulombe wanted the contract to be made on one page, but the German lawyers refused to write it, so Joe's attorney wrote it instead. The contract ended up being longer than one page, however.

Coulombe was succeeded as CEO by his Stanford roommate, John V. Shields, in 1987. Under his leadership, the company expanded into Arizona in 1993 and into the Pacific Northwest two years later. In 1996, the company opened its first stores on the East Coast in Brookline and Cambridge, both outside Boston. In 2001, Shields retired and Dan Bane succeeded him as CEO.

Since its inception, Trader Joe's has continued to expand across the United States. In 2004, BusinessWeek reported that Trader Joe's quintupled its number of stores between 1990 and 2001 and increased its profits tenfold. In February 2008, BusinessWeek reported that the company had the highest sales per square foot of any grocer in the United States. Two-and-a-half years later and in 2016, Fortune magazine estimated sales to be $1,750 in merchandise per square foot, more than double the sales generated by Whole Foods.

Joe Coulombe, the namesake of the brand, died in 2020. Dan Bane retired as the CEO in July 2023 and was succeeded by Bryan Palbaum, previously the company's COO and president. At the same time, the company named Jon Basalone as vice-CEO and president, taking over from Palbaum in the latter role.

== Locations ==
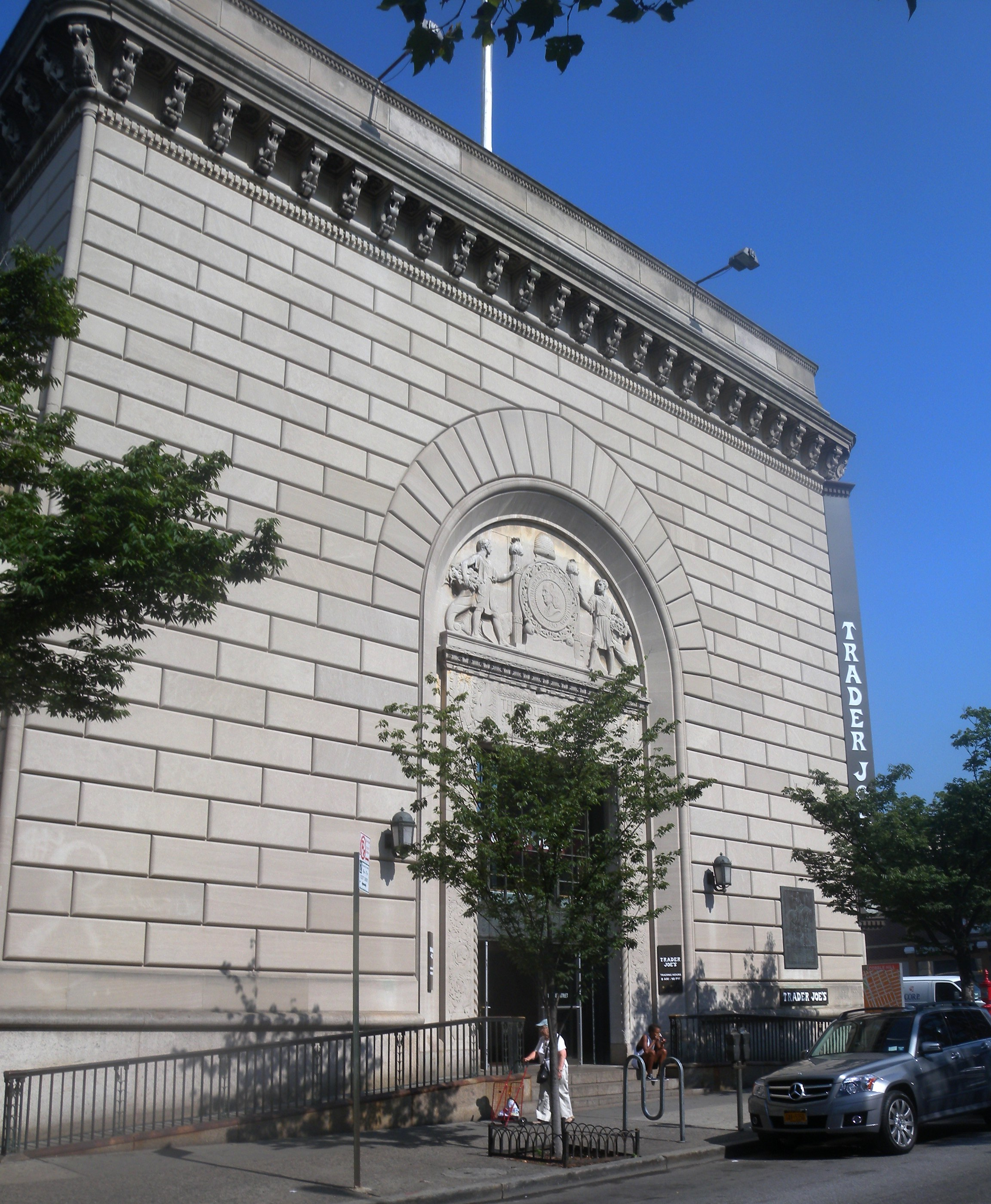
A Trader Joe's store in Cobble Hill, Brooklyn, New York, in a converted bank building

As of November 16, 2026, Trader Joe's had 662 stores across 43 states as well as the District of Columbia in the United States with stores being added regularly. Most locations averaged between 10,000 sq ft (930 m^{2}) and 15,000 sq ft (1,400 m^{2}). California has the largest number of stores, with 205 open in the state. The chain's busiest location is its 72nd & Broadway store on the Upper West Side of Manhattan. The smallest Trader Joe's location is in the Back Bay neighborhood of Boston, Massachusetts, on Boylston St.

Each location is designed to represent its respective area, with staff members creating murals along store walls to represent the surrounding neighborhood. Some store locations have their own "find the mascot", and children can obtain stickers and lollipops when they tell a staff member where it is "hiding”. Crew members typically hide the mascot in the stores.

=== Economic exclusivity and gentrification ===
Despite being known as a "neighborhood store" with affordable options, Trader Joe's locations are mostly in well-off neighborhoods. In 2022, the typical Trader Joe's customer was a married person living in an urban area, between 25 and 44 years old, earning at least $80,000. When deciding where to open locations, the chain typically looks for areas where the median household income is over $100,000.

Conversely, Trader Joe's has also faced opposition for contributing to gentrification. Between 1997 and 2014, Zillow found that homes grow more rapidly in value if they are closer to a Trader Joe's or Whole Foods, with such homes consistently being worth more than the mean U.S. home. In 2014, Trader Joe's agreed to halt plans to open a store in a historically black neighborhood in Portland, Oregon, following protests led by the Portland African American Leadership Forum. The organization objected to the $2.4 million subsidy offered by the city to Trader Joe's and emphasized that they were not against Trader Joe's but instead were pushing back against the city's history of displacing African Americans. In 2015, along with a proposal to build new affordable housing, the city announced that a different store, Natural Grocers, would be built on the vacant lot.

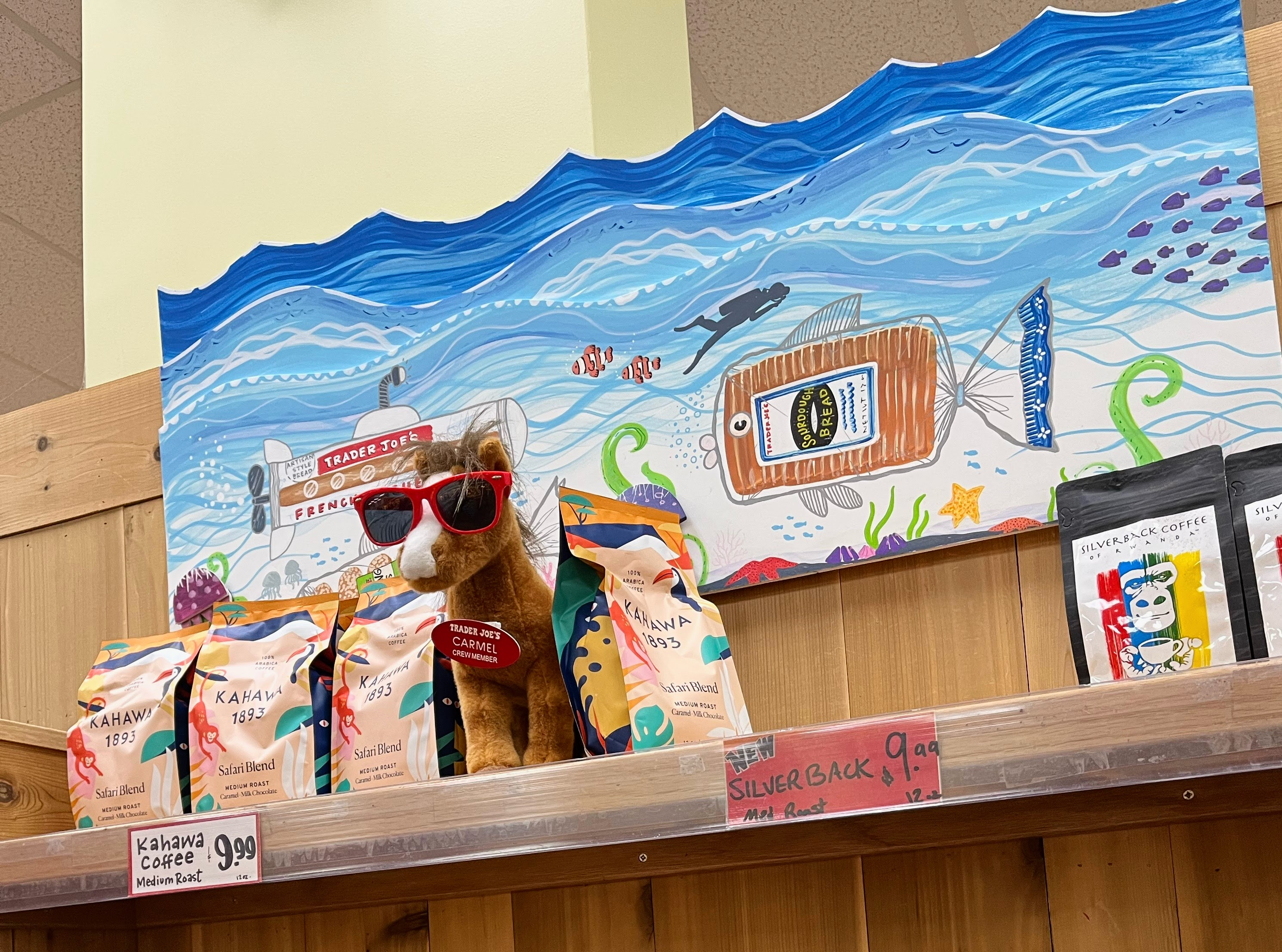
A local stuffed animal mascot at a Trader Joe's store

== Products ==
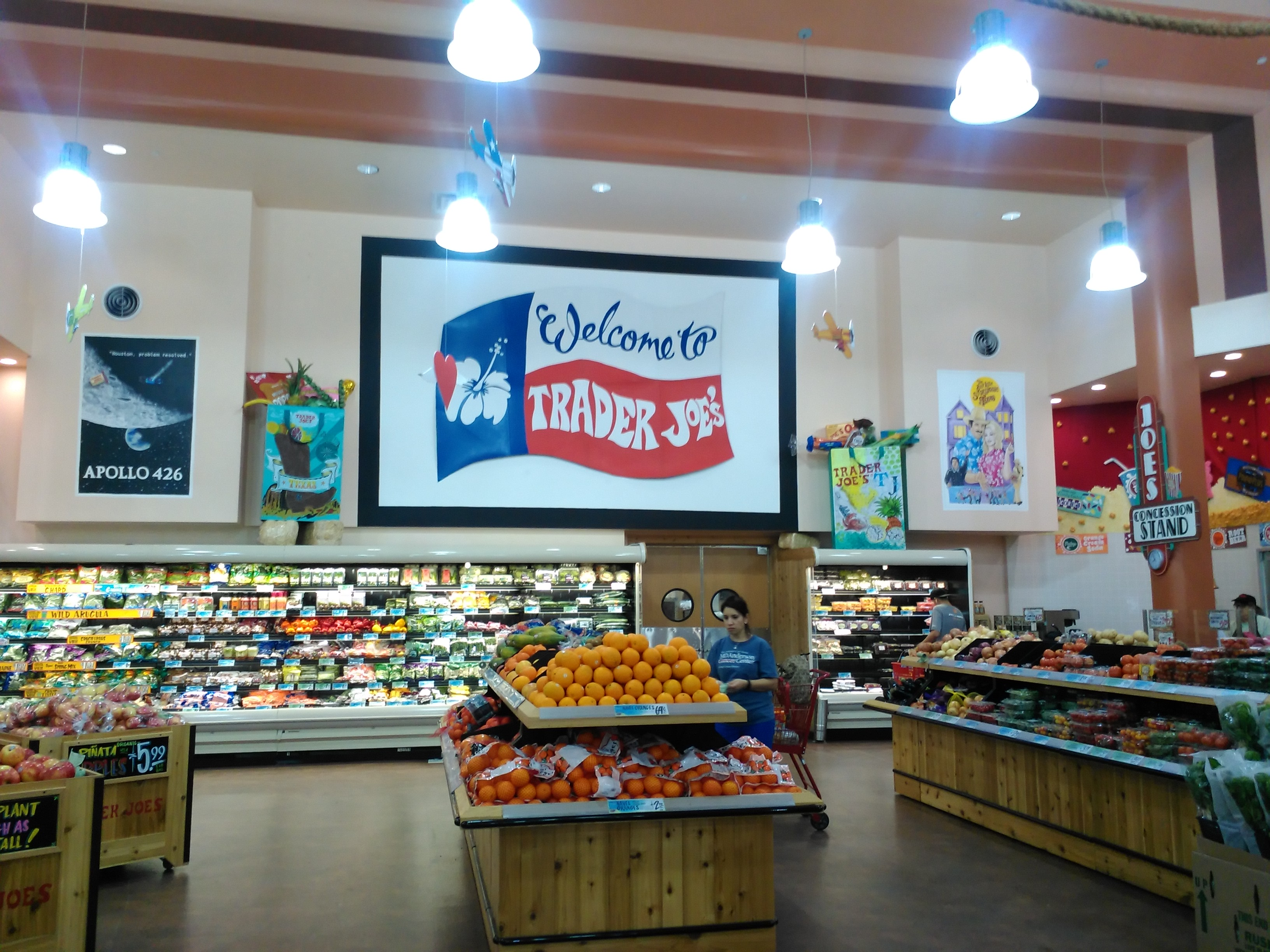
Interior of Trader Joe's in the Alabama Theatre in Houston

=== Private label ===
Trader Joe's sells many items under its own private labels, at a significant discount to name-brand equivalents, and requires its name-brand suppliers not to publicize this business relationship. By selling almost all of its products under its own labels, Trader Joe's "skips the middle man" and buys directly from both local and international vendors. The company has been criticized for allegedly copying products from vendors after soliciting partnerships and requesting sample products for their private labels.

While a typical grocery store may carry 50,000 items, Trader Joe's stocks about 4,000 items, 80% of which bear one of its brand names. Products include gourmet foods, organic foods, vegan and vegetarian foods, frozen foods, imported foods, and domestic and imported wine and beer (where local law permits).

In 1977, the company began introducing international-sounding variants of its brand for some of its private-label ethnic food items, such as "Trader José", "Trader Joe San", and "Trader Giotto" for Mexican, Japanese, and Italian products, respectively. The company also referenced other cultures with branding like "Trader Ming's", "Arabian Joe's", and "Pilgrim Joe" for Chinese, Middle Eastern, and Thanksgiving-themed American products. In July 2020, during the George Floyd protests, an online petition signed by 5,300 people asked the company to rename these products, criticized their labeling as "racist" and accusing the company of promoting "a narrative of exoticism that perpetuates harmful stereotypes".

The company reacted by stating that it was already in the process of reverting several international foods to Trader Joe's branding and that this decision had already been made several years earlier. Trader Joe's later clarified that some branding referenced in the petition would remain, stating, "We disagree that any of these labels are racist. We do not make decisions based on petitions." The petition itself has been criticized on social media for promoting cancel culture and for "wasting time on a trivial issue".

Aldi Nord uses the brand as one of the company's private labels in its stores in Europe, predominantly for snack foods.

Ajinomoto is the manufacturer for some of the brand's private-label fried rice products.

=== Notable products ===
Trader Joe's maintains a "Product Hall of Fame" to recognize private label items that have achieved sustained commercial success and cultural significance. While the company has held annual Customer Choice Awards since 2009, the Hall of Fame was established in 2023 to honor products that consistently topped the rankings, thereby removing them from future eligibility to allow newer products to compete.

Notable inductees include the Mandarin Orange Chicken, a long-standing staple of the brand's frozen offerings, and Speculoos Cookie Butter, which gained media attention for its viral popularity and consumer demand. The Chili & Lime Flavored Rolled Corn Tortilla Chips, frequently compared to the brand Takis, were inducted after winning the "Overall" favorite category for multiple consecutive years. Additionally, seasonal items like Spiced Cider have been noted for their longevity, with the brand maintaining dedicated orchards for its production for over two decades.

=== Product availability and discontinued products ===
Trader Joe's discontinues individual products more often than larger grocery chains. A product may be discontinued because of a variety of reasons: it may be a seasonal product; the cost of producing the item may have increased, thereby also increasing its price for consumers; or the item was not selling strongly enough. New items are introduced every week, so Trader Joe's may remove current items to make room for new products on its shelves. Stores often have a "new items" case with 10 to 15 products (that can also be found in the rest of the store), indicating an intentional high turnover of products.

Product selection and prices may also differ from state to state. For freshly prepared items (e.g., deli, bakery, dairy and juice), Trader Joe's tries to source products as close to the stores as possible, which may result in variations with recipes and prices. State laws, taxes, deposit requirements, and distribution costs can also influence how products are priced in each location.

In February 2008, Trader Joe's announced that it would phase out single-ingredient products from China by April 2008, because of unspecified customer concerns.

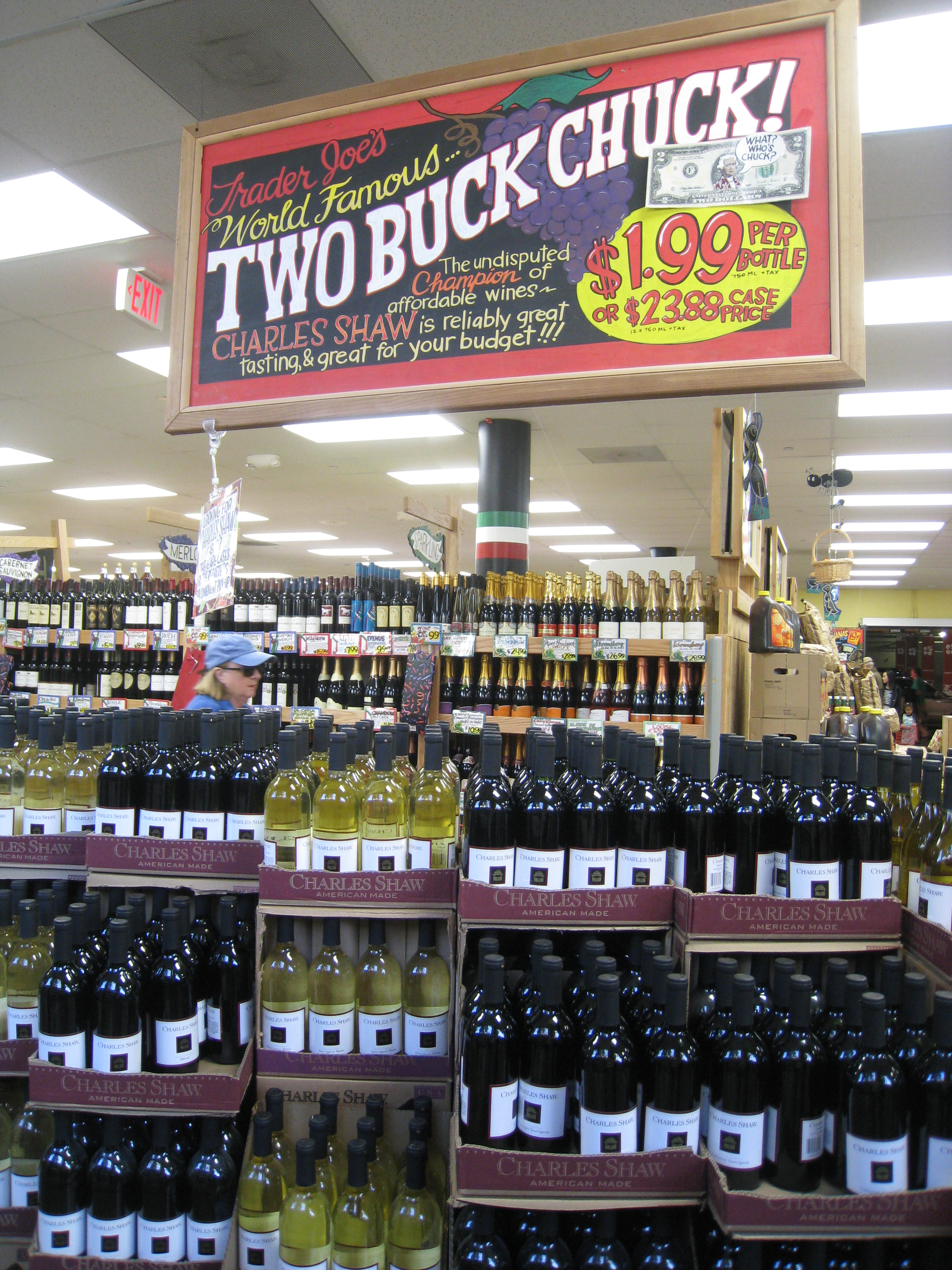
"Two Buck Chuck" for sale at Trader Joe's

=== Cage-free eggs ===
In February 2016, because of customer feedback, Trader Joe's announced their goal "to have all the eggs [they] sell in western states (California, Oregon, Washington, Arizona, Utah, New Mexico and Colorado) come from cage-free suppliers by 2020 and all the eggs [they] sell nationally to come from cage-free suppliers by 2025".

In March 2018, a consumer protection lawsuit was filed by the Animal Legal Defense Fund against Trader Joe's on behalf of an egg purchaser. The lawsuit sought to stop Trader Joe's from deceptively and misleadingly labeling its cage-free eggs. The consumer argued that Trader Joe's was violating multiple California consumer protection laws by selling cage-free eggs in cartons with representations of hens foraging in pastures, when the eggs were actually from industrial hen houses, where hens do not have access to the outdoors. The case settled in June 2018, in which Trader Joe's agreed to pull the packaging not only in California but nationwide.

=== Wine ===
Trader Joe's is the exclusive retailer of Charles Shaw wine, popularly known as "Two Buck Chuck" because of its original $1.99 price tag in California (local prices vary). Of the wine selection at Trader Joe's, Coulombe said, "We built Trader Joe's on wine first, then food. I tasted 100,000 wines, and most weren't wonderful. They were submitted to us by desperate vintners". Upon the death of Fred Franzia of the Charles Shaw label in September 2022, The New York Times reported Trader Joe's had sold over one billion bottles. The company leaves names of wineries off the labels on purpose, although many are from Bronco Wine, the company behind Charles Shaw.

The chain closed its only wine store in New York City on August 11, 2022, right before workers were about to put unionization to a vote. "The closure comes after historic union victories at stores in Massachusetts and Minnesota," wrote Business Insider.

== Sustainability ==
Trader Joe's states that "a continuing focus of [their] sustainability initiatives is maintaining product integrity and preventing food waste". However, in 2016, the company agreed to a settlement with the Environmental Protection Agency and Department of Justice, due to allegations it had violated the Clean Air Act by emitting high global warming potential (GWP) and ozone-depleting refrigerants. The company was tasked with reducing its emissions and creating a process to track and repair refrigerants, and was required to use refrigerants with an ultra-low GWP in 15 stores. Since then, the company has not shared its progress to reduce leak rates or publicly report its climate emissions.

The retailer has also been characterized as "notoriously secretive", and it has also been criticized for a lack of transparency by management about the sources of products such as organic milk. Trader Joe's scores the lowest on Green America's chocolate scorecard, as the retailer shares very little about addressing child labor or deforestation caused by the chocolate it sells.

=== Improving packaging ===
Trader Joe's has been taking steps to make its products more environmentally friendly. In 2019, Greenpeace delivered a petition of 100,000 signatures for Trader Joe's to phase out single-use plastics. In response to customer pressure, Trader Joe's committed to stop offering single-use carryout bags nationwide, replace its produce bags with biodegradable and compostable options, replace styrofoam trays, and sell more loose, unwrapped produce.

In 2021, as part of an ongoing effort to improve packaging, Trader Joe's stated that it had improved over 200 products by eliminating excess components, and increasing the amount of recycled and sustainably sourced materials. The company also removed over 4 million pounds of plastic packaging from its products in 2021. Examples of improvements include removing plastic mesh packaging from produce, converting plastic clamshells for produce to sealed fiber trays, and increasing the number of frozen entrees in a plastic tray with a compostable option.

=== Phasing out unsustainable foods ===
Between 2012 and 2013, Trader Joe's moved from 15th on Greenpeace's CATO (Carting Away the Oceans) scale to third by removing six unsustainable species of fish from its shelves and getting involved in efforts to protect the Bering Sea Canyons.

=== Eliminating food waste ===
Trader Joe's said that in 2021, approximately 99.5% of all products were sold in stores, donated to food recovery partners, or composted. Through its "Neighborhood Shares Program", Trader Joe's donates 100% of the unsold products to local food recovery organizations With that system set in place, the Salem, Oregon store was able to donate all their frozen products during a 31-hour power outage before they went to waste. In 2021, the total volume donated amounted to more than $349 million worth of products to nonprofit partners, and nearly 63 million meals served to local communities, while in 2023, they were able to donate $469 million more worth of products to their communities, representing "104 million pounds of nutritious food".

== Animal welfare ==
In January 2025, an Instagram video created by Zoe Rosenberg and Direct Action Everywhere described criminal animal abuse by a Trader Joe's supplier, Petaluma Poultry, a Perdue subsidiary. Trader Joe's took legal action to stop disruptive protests that ensued at its stores. Activists have continued to call on Trader Joe's to stop purchasing from Petaluma Poultry.

== Ratings ==
In May 2009, Consumer Reports ranked Trader Joe's the second-best supermarket chain in the United States (after Wegmans). In June 2009, MSN Money released its annual Customer Service Hall of Fame survey results, in which Trader Joe's ranked second in customer service. In 2014, Consumer Reports again ranked Trader Joe's a top-scoring supermarket chain. The company ranked number 23 among the 2019 Glassdoor best places to work in the US, and number 14 in 2020. In 2025, their ranking dropped to 30th.

A YouGov survey in 2023 placed Trader Joe's in third place overall in terms of America's favorite grocery stores, scoring a 64% popularity rating.

In 2025, the Retail and Consumer Shipping Study via American Customer Satisfaction Index (ACSI) placed Trader Joe's at 84%- tying for first place with Publix. In 2026, their score increased by 2 points to a total of 86% satisfaction- taking first and leaving Publix in second.

== Criticisms ==
Trader Joe's utilizes private labels for the majority of their products, meaning a private and often unknown third-party manufacturer produces the product and packages under the Trader Joe's brand name. This has raised concerns due to the lack of transparency as Trader Joe's has issued several high-profile recalls, but do not identify their private suppliers.

In 2020, at least one online petition was circulated to stop Trader Joe's alternative brand names for products from other culinary cultures, citing racism. For example, Asian products were sold under the brand name "Trader Ming's", and Mexican foods were sold under the name "Trader Jose's". Trader Joe's has agreed to change some of its product branding.

== Labor relations ==
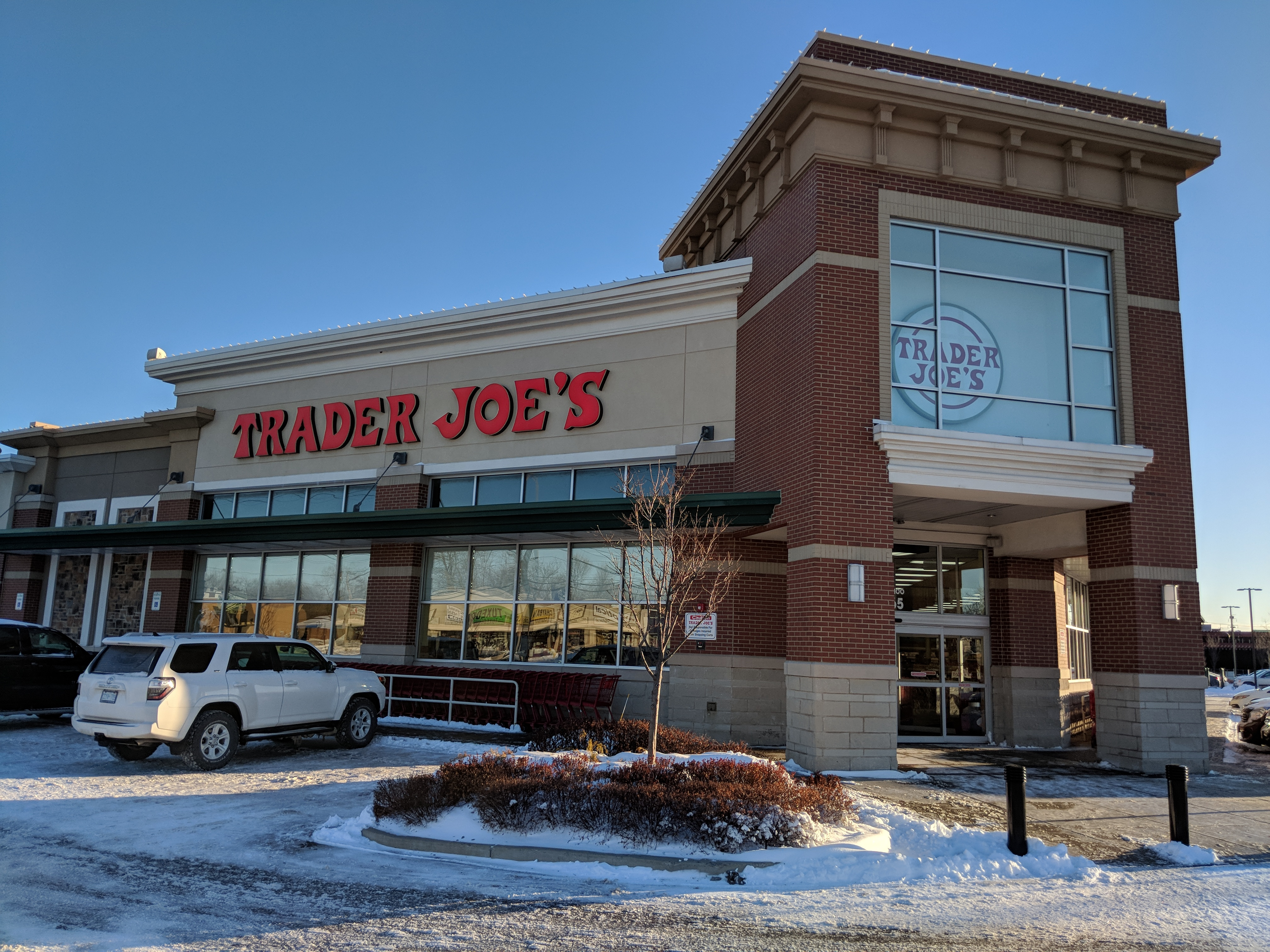
Trader Joe's in Amherst, New York, 2018

In September 2013, in response to the implementation of the Affordable Care Act (ACA), Trader Joe's stated that it would require part-time employees to work an average of 30 hours per week to qualify for medical insurance (with free coverage for basic dental and vision care still being available for all crew members who work an average of 15 hours or more per week). Part-time employees who were not qualifying for medical insurance would now be eligible for plans that were available under the ACA (but they would only be made available to those employees whose employers do not offer them an insurance plan). Those employees who were working full-time were unaffected. Maeg Yosef, a union organizer who has worked for 18 years at the Hadley, Massachusetts, store, said the company cut contributions to employee retirement plans from the equivalent of 15% of an employee's annual pay down to nothing since she started there. Workers at the Trader Joe's grocery store in Hadley announced in an open letter dated May 14, 2022, to the company's CEO their intent to push for unionization, citing stagnant wages and a desire for better pay, benefits and workplace conditions.

Trader Joe's has been accused of union busting in numerous cases. The first Trader Joe's store to be unionized was in Hadley, Massachusetts, in 2022.

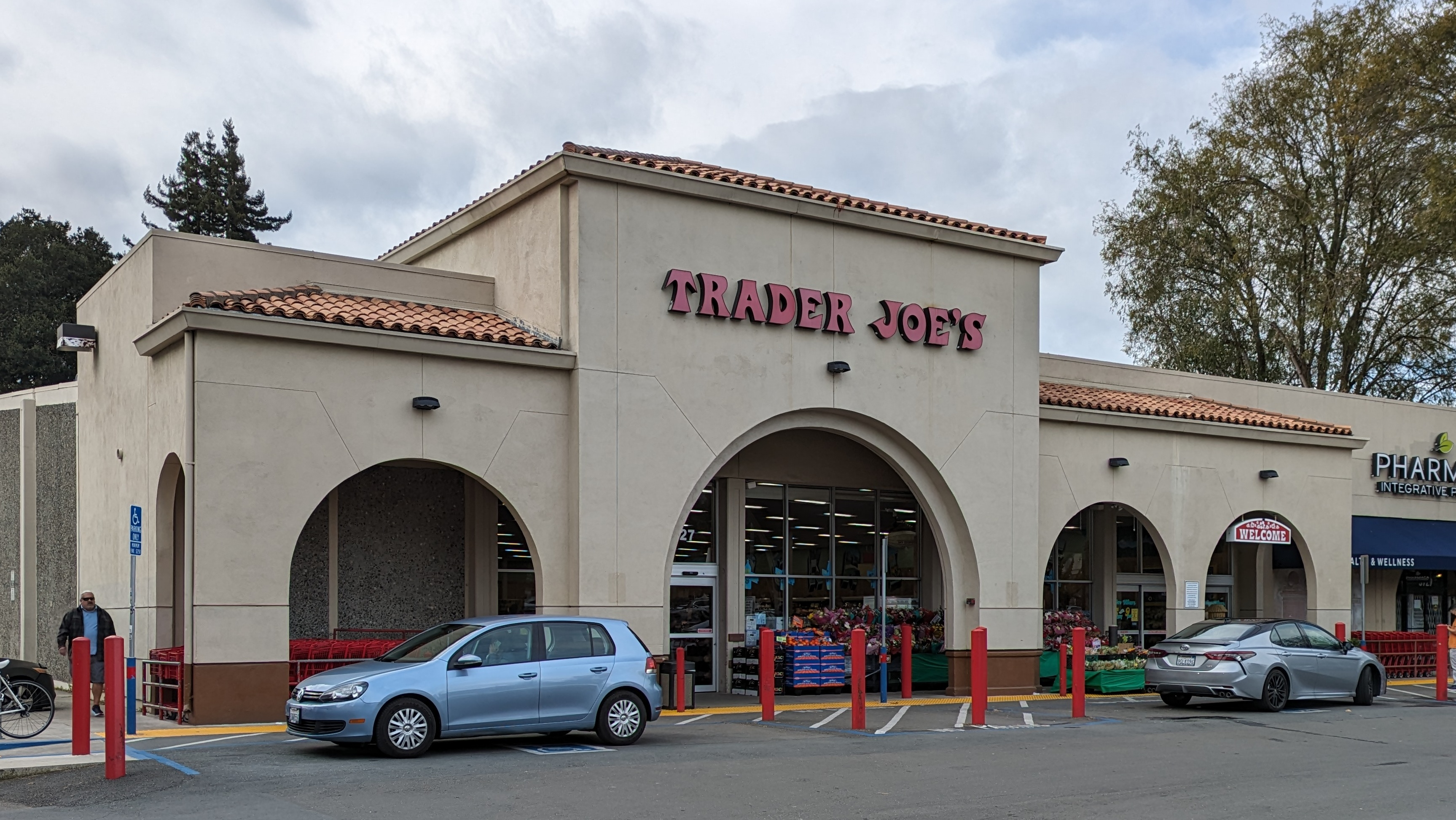
The Trader Joe's store in Rockridge, Oakland, where employees voted to unionize in 2023

On April 20, 2023, crew members at the Trader Joe's location in the Rockridge neighborhood of Oakland, California, voted 73–53 to unionize.

In January 2024, at an administrative law hearing in Connecticut, a Trader Joe's lawyer amended the company's answer to include an additional affirmative defense, stating that they believed the National Labor Relations Board and its administrative law judges to be unconstitutional. The Board enforces U.S. labor law in relation to collective bargaining and unfair labor practices and was investigating complaints from a Trader Joe's in Hadley, Massachusetts, and Minneapolis, Minnesota. Trader Joe's "hoped to preserve the issue for future briefing and argument," while continuing with the case before an administrative law judge for the NLRB. Trader Joe's statement mirrored arguments made by several other companies — SpaceX, Starbucks, and Amazon.

== In popular culture ==
Trader Joe's is a recognizable brand in both the United States and, increasingly, abroad. The grocery store chain sells small and large canvas tote bags, stitched with the Trader Joe's logo. Given the trend of carrying a canvas tote bag in metropolitan areas, the Trader Joe's tote bag has been popularized by young city dwellers as far as London, England. Due to high demand, the bags were reported to have a resale value much higher than the original price in certain global markets.

There have been references to the grocery store in movies, television, and music. In Jonathan Levine's 2017 action-comedy, Snatched, Chris Meloni portrays a Trader Joe's floor manager from Buffalo, New York. In 2018, Brooklyn rapper Junglepussy released a single entitled Trader Joe's, later re-released on her EP, JP3.

== Handmade signage and sign artists ==
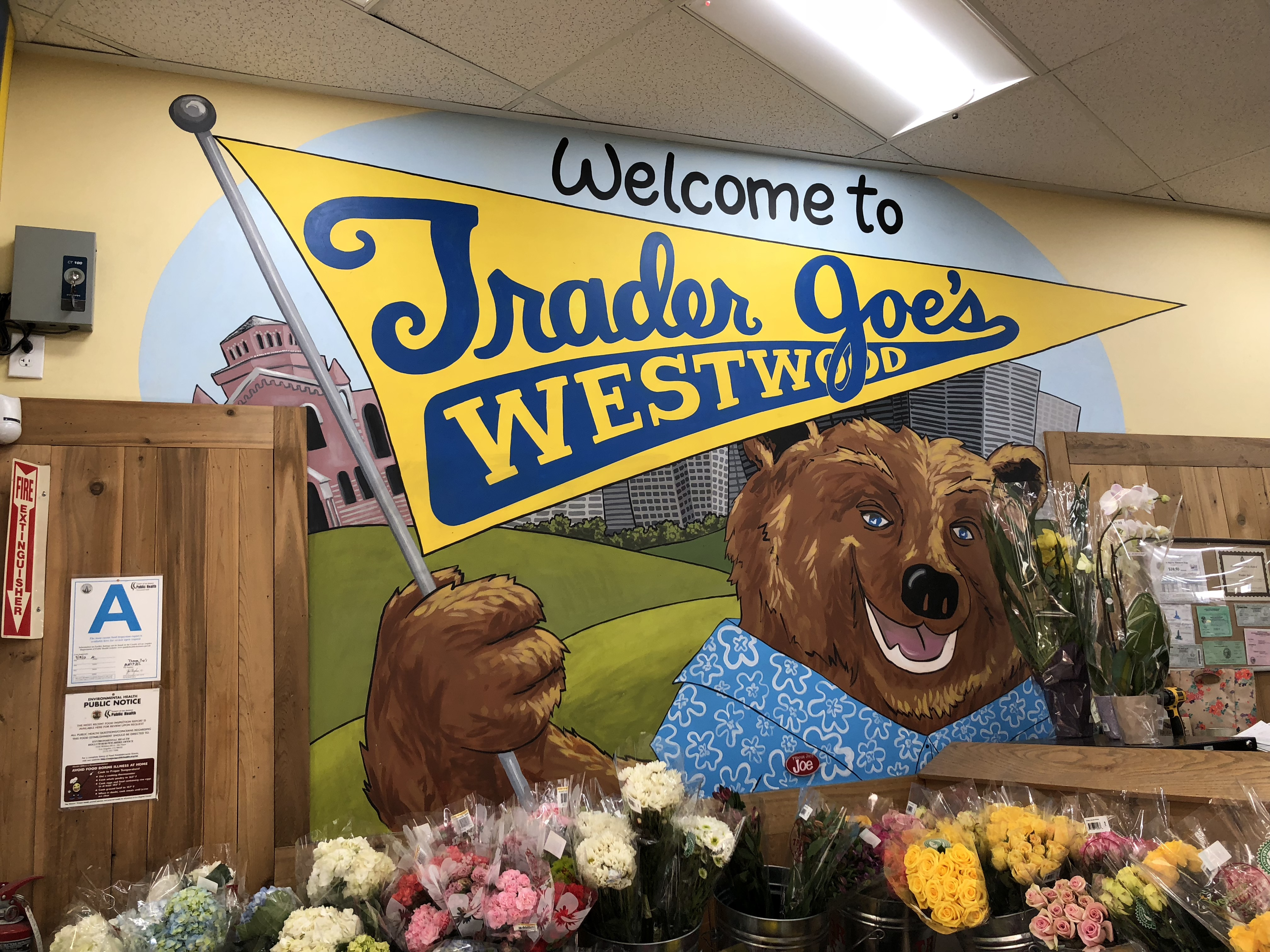
Mural in Trader Joe's Westwood location in 2018, featuring nearby college UCLA's mascot and colors

Trader Joe's uses handmade signage as a major piece of their signature style and to enhance their “neighborhood grocery store” positioning. The signs are unique to each location and often feature nods to each store's surrounding community. Signs change frequently due to product additions and removals, price changes, holidays, and seasonal shifts.

These signs are designed and made by crew members commonly known as "sign artists" but are referred to by Trader Joe's as "crew members with sign making talent" because they typically also perform duties other than creating signs. Sign artists commonly work in art teams of three to five crew members to complete murals, price tags, end caps, and product labels. Many sign artists choose to post their work to social media platforms, where they communicate and share ideas with other sign artists.

== See also ==
- List of supermarket chains in North America
- Pirate Joe's
