= Cakebread Cellars =

Winery in Rutherford, California, US

- Location: 8300 St. Helena Highway, Rutherford, California, US
- Coordinates: 38.447897°N 122.410739°W
- Wine region: Napa County, California
- Appellation: Napa Valley AVA
- Formerly: Sturdivant Ranch
- Founded: 1973
- First vines planted: AxR1 rootstock
- First vintage: 1973
- Opened to the public: 1974
- Key people: Jack and Dolores Cakebread
- Area cultivated: 460
- Cases/yr: 200,000
- Known for: Chardonnay Reserve
- Varietals: Chardonnay, Sauvignon Blanc, Pinot Noir, Cabernet Sauvignon, Merlot, Syrah, Zinfandel
- Other attractions: American Harvest Workshop
- Distribution: International
- Tasting: By appointment
- Website: www.cakebread.com

Cakebread Cellars is a Napa Valley winery known for its Chardonnay and Sauvignon Blanc wines, which are internationally distributed. Founded in 1973 by Jack and Dolores Cakebread in Rutherford, California, the winery produces approximately 200,000 cases of wine per year.

== History ==
Jack and Dolores Cakebread met in high school in Oakland, California, and were married in 1950. After Jack completed his military service during the Korean War, the couple settled in Oakland with their three sons, Steve, Dennis, and Bruce. Jack Cakebread, who had worked on his family's orchard in Contra Costa County, worked with his father at Cakebread's Garage in Oakland. He also developed an interest in photography. In 1972, while taking photographs for Nathan Chroman's book Treasury of American Wines, Jack and Dolores Cakebread offered to purchase the Sturdivant Ranch in Rutherford, California. The Sturdivant family accepted their offer, and soon the Cakebreads were attending winemaking classes at the University of California, Davis, where they learned from local vintners Louis M. Martini and Robert Mondavi. Cakebread Cellars has been described as a “pioneer of California’s modern wine industry” that helped lead the transformation of Napa Valley from a little-known agricultural area into “the epicenter of American wine”.

During the first few years, Jack and Dolores divided their time between the garage and establishing the winery on the weekends. Within a year of their purchase the Cakebreads planted their first Sauvignon Blanc on AxR1 rootstock. In 1974, the original winery was completed and Cakebread Cellars produced its first wine: 157 cases of 1973 Chardonnay. The following year, they crushed their first Cabernet Sauvignon grapes at Keenan Winery. In 1976, they released the first Cakebread Cellars Cabernet Sauvignon ('74 vintage), and their first vintage of Zinfandel, produced at Las Domingus Ranch on Howell Mountain. The original winery was enlarged in 1977, and Mondavi enologist Larry Wara was hired as a wine consultant. The following year, Cakebread produced three Cabernets for '78 vintage: JTL1, Napa Valley, and Lot 2. In 1979, Bruce Cakebread joined the family business as a full-time winemaker after graduating from the University of California, Davis. That year, five fermenters were installed outside the front barn.

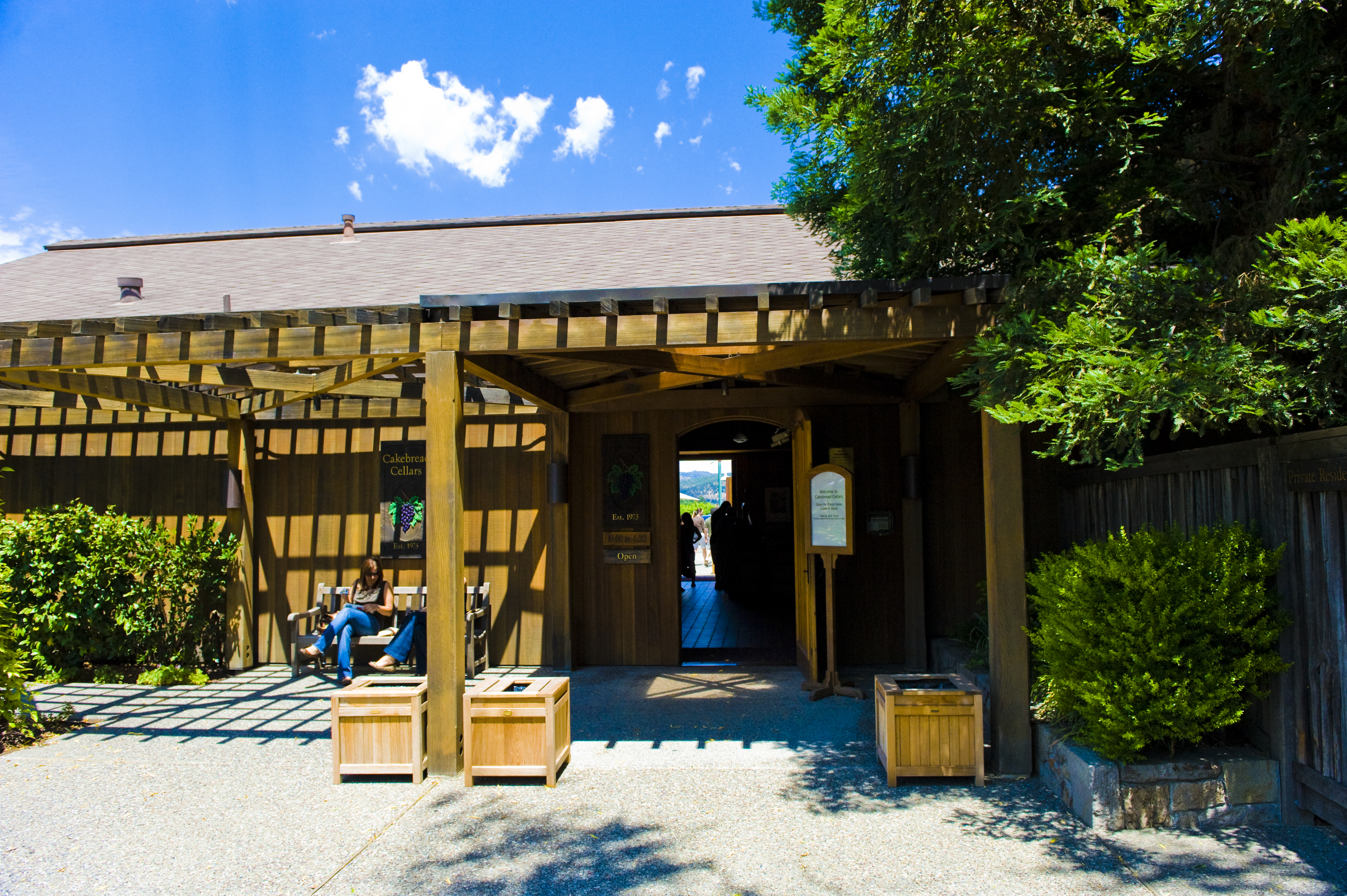
Cakebread Cellars front entrance

The 1980s saw significant growth at Cakebread Cellars. In 1980, a new winery building was constructed. Designed by architect William Turnbull Jr., the building's design won awards from the California Architects Association in 1981, the East Bay Architects Association in 1982, and the AIA & Wood Council in 1983. Cakebread also produced its first Rutherford Reserve vintage in 1980. The following year, the winery's first employee Tod Dexter was hired; he would stay with Cakebread for eight years, and then go on to start his own wine label, Dexter Winery, in Mornington Peninsula near Melbourne. In 1982, Jack Cakebread acquired an adjacent 12-acre ranch and planted Cabernet Sauvignon and Cabernet Franc. After introducing state-of-the-art neutron probe technology to maximize vineyard production, Cakebread Cellars began marketing internationally in the United Kingdom, Canada, Japan, Hong Kong, and Singapore in 1984. In 1985, the Cakebread's remodeled their 100-year-old winery home with a state-of-the-art kitchen and comfortable guest accommodations. That year, Jim May became Cakebread's first resident chef. In 1986, Dennis Cakebread joined the family business, managing finance, sales, and marketing. In the fall of 1986, Cakebread hosted its first American Harvest Workshop to showcase prominent chefs and artisan food purveyors from around the country. The following year, the American Harvest Workshop became an annual fall event.

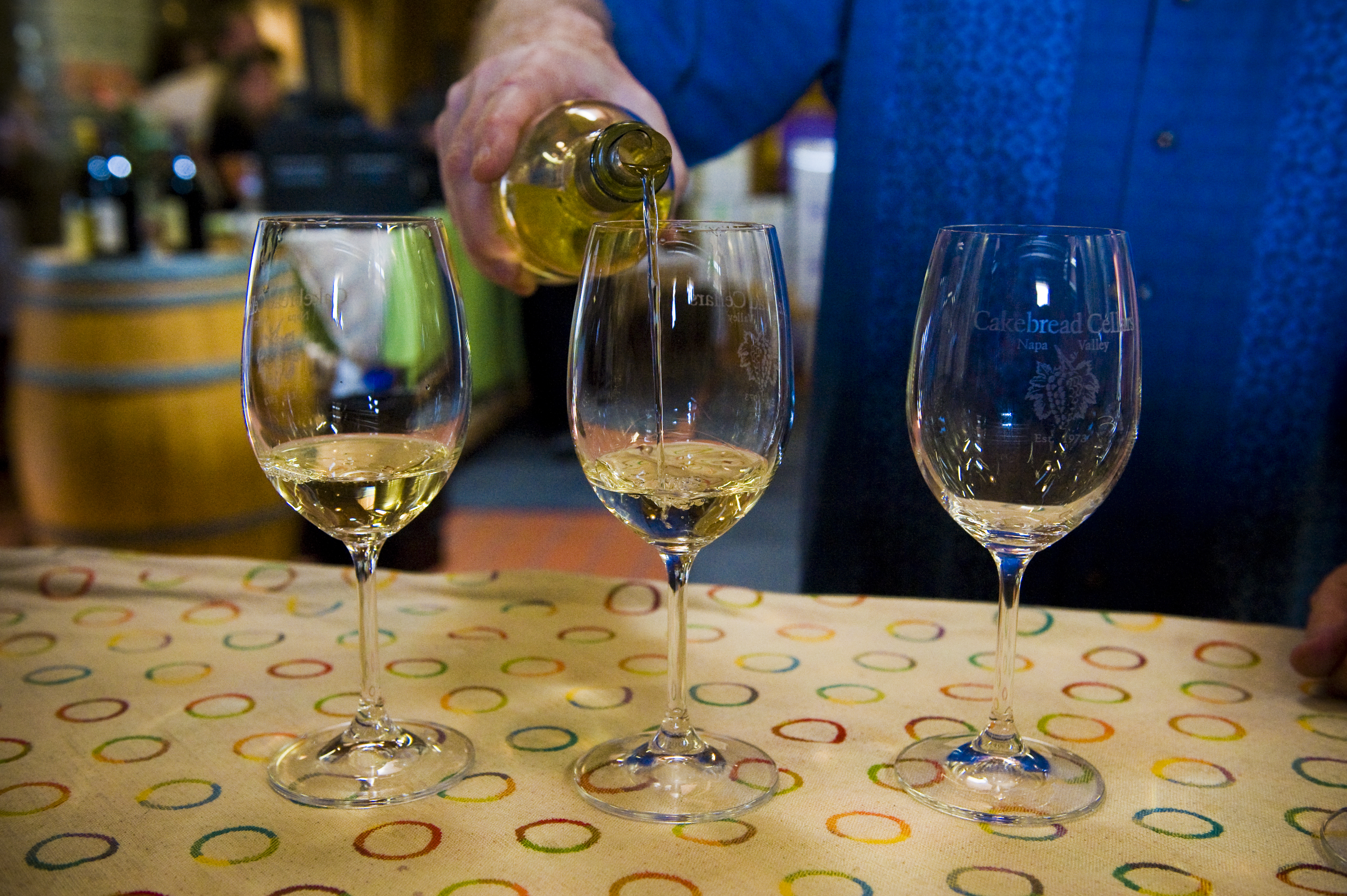
Cakebread Cellars wine tasting

During the 1990s, Cakebread Cellars underwent significant growth and established its reputation as a producer of world-class wines. In 1990, Jack Cakebread served as president of the Napa Valley Vintners Association, and the following year Cakebread produced their first Merlot. Cakebread's early success built a loyal following and enabled Cakebread to continue purchasing top vineyards. Soon their sons Bruce and Dennis joined the family business full-time. In 1994, they introduced their first Pinot Noir and Rubaiyat. That year they completed replanting of all 75 acres damaged from phylloxera. Due to the development of sub-AVA of Oakville and Rutherford, the 1993 and 1994 vintages of Rutherford Reserve were changed to "reserve". In 1995, Cakebread introduced Three Sisters and Benchland Select, and purchased a 60-acre former apple orchard in Anderson Valley and began developing this vineyard for Pinot Noir and Chardonnay. In 1996, the winery started purchasing fruit in Carneros from Foster Road and then Tinsley Ranch. The following year, the third phase of the winery expansion project was completed, allowing for further expansion with the purchase of an adjacent winery and vineyard. Also that year, Dennis Cakebread served as president of the Napa Valley Vintner Association. In 1998, Cakebread purchased 200 acres on Howell Mountain and began developing these hillside vineyards into what would become Dancing Bear Ranch.

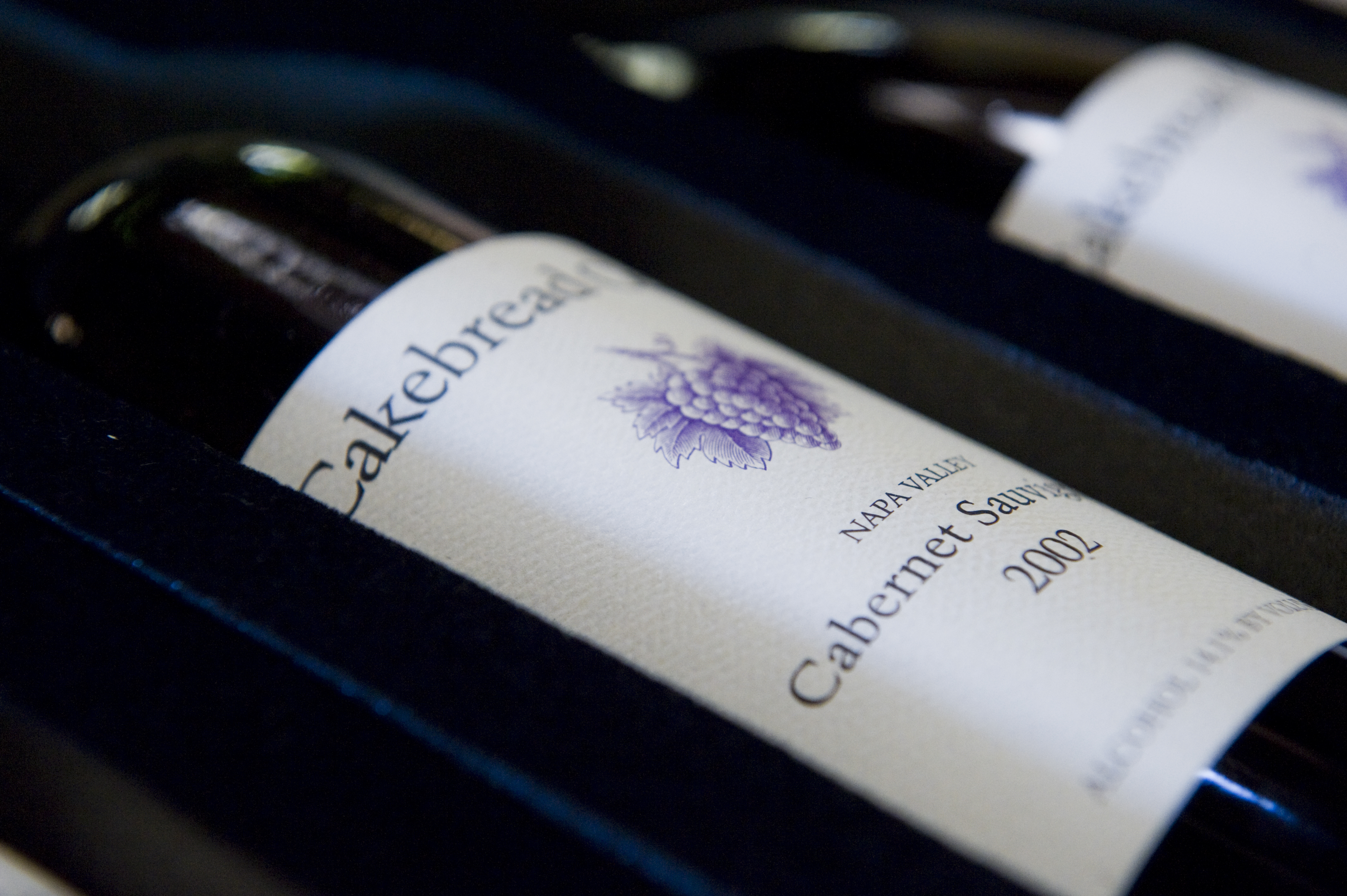
Cakebread Cellars 2002 Cabernet Sauvignon

The past fifteen years have seen the continued expansion and refinement of Cakebread Cellars. In 2000, Cakebread completed its Oakville winery facility. The following year, the family purchased the adjacent 1.7 acre McKay parcel. In 2002, Bruce Cakebread became president and chief operating officer of the company, and Julianne Laks became winemaker. The first vintage of Dancing Bear Ranch was produced that year. In 2003, Cakebread acquired the 27-acre Foster Road Vineyard in Carneros and the 40-acre Maple Lane Vineyards in Calistoga. In 2004, University of California, Davis graduate Toby Halkovich was hired as viticulturist. That year, the winery purchased Tinsley Ranch in Carneros, the Cuttings Wharf Road Vineyard, and Suscol Springs Ranch in southeast Napa. In 2006, the winery purchased its Milton Road property in Carneros, and the following year the east addition to the main building was completed with tasting areas and lab space. In 2008, Cakebread acquired its Arroyo Creek Vineyard. In 2009, Dennis Cakebread became vice-chairman of the Board of Directors, and the Suscol Springs Vineyard produced its first commercial wines. The following year, Bruce Cakebread served as president of the Napa Valley Vintners. In 2012, Cakebread purchased Annahala Vineyard in Anderson Valley. That same year, the company initiated plans to pave a new parking lot, relocate the bottling line, add new storage space, and build a new visitor facility. In 2022 the winery hired a new CFO Rich Archer.

Jack Cakebread died on April 26, 2022, at the age of 92. He was preceded in death by his wife, Dolores, who died in 2020. Obituaries praised him as a "vintner who shaped modern Napa Valley."

== Vineyards ==
Cakebread Cellars currently produces wines from eleven estate vineyard properties located throughout Napa Valley and one location in the Anderson Valley. Following the initial purchase of the first 22-acre parcel in Rutherford in 1972, the family acquired additional vineyard parcels throughout Napa Valley and the North Coast. Cakebread Cellars currently owns thirteen sites totaling 982 acres, 460 of which are currently planted in eleven vineyards that produce approximately 75,000 cases of wine per year.

- Tinsley Ranch Vineyard is located in the south eastern area of Napa Carneros. With its typical Carneros haire loam soils, the ranch has produced a significant portion of Cakebread's Napa Chardonnay since 1992. The vineyard was planted in 1988 and 1998.
- Winery Ranch (52 vineyard acres) is located between the Napa River and the Mayacamas Mountains. This vineyard produces Sauvignon Blanc, Sémillon, Sauvignon Musque, Cabernet Sauvignon, and Merlot. This was the original vineyard from which Cakebread Cellars emerged. The vineyard was planted in 1992, 1993, 1994, and 1999.
- Milton Road Vineyard (42.5 vineyard acres) is located at the southern end of the Carneros viticulture area of Napa Valley. The vines here are rooted in a thin layer of haire loam soil and the climate is generally cool. This vineyard produces multiple clonal selections of Chardonnay and Syrah. The vineyard was planted in 1989, 1994, 2002, and 2006.
- Suscol Springs Vineyard (110 vineyard acres) is located on a hillside southeast of the town of Napa. The soils are rocky and well drained and the climate is cool. This vineyard produces Cabernet Sauvignon, Cabernet Franc, Grenache, Merlot, Petit Verdot, Sauvignon Blanc, and Syrah. The vineyard was planted in 2007.
- Anderson Valley Vineyard (46 vineyard acres) is located on a former apple orchard just north of Boonville on the banks of Anderson Creek. The terrain is uniform in texture and slope and consists of boontling loam and talmage gravelly loam soils. This vineyard produces Pinot Noir and Chardonnay.The vineyard was planted in 2001.
- Cuttings Wharf Road (56 vineyard acres) is located on a low ridge in the rolling plains of the eastern Carneros viticulture area of Napa Valley. The vines are rooted in shallow, uniform haire loam soils, which allow for a control root zone in cool climate. This vineyard produces Chardonnay and Sauvignon Blanc. The vineyard was planted in 2005 and 2007.
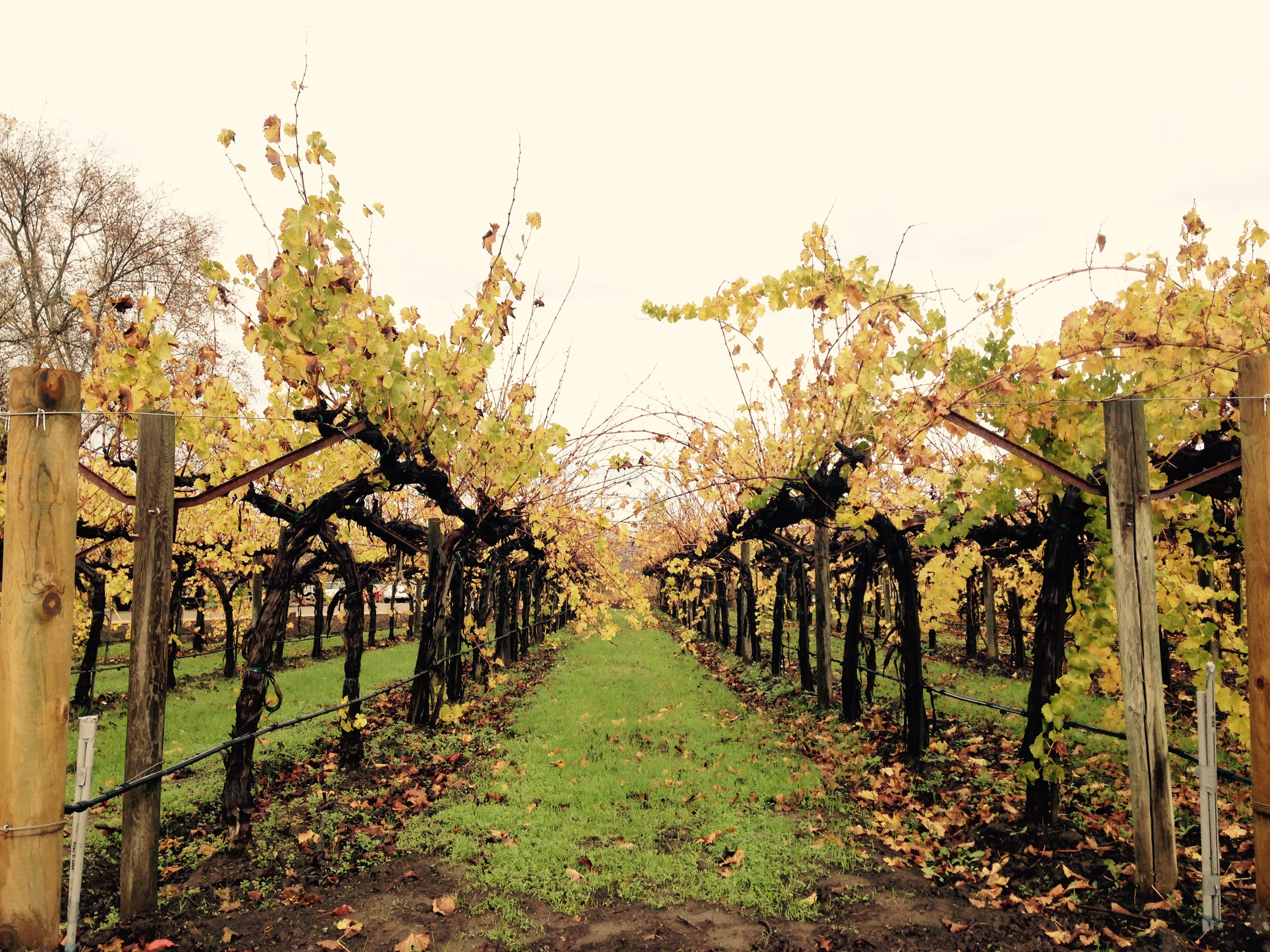
  Cakebread vineyard
- Dancing Bear Ranch (28 vineyard acres) is located on the slopes of Howell Mountain in northern Napa Valley. The vines are rooted in shallow, rocky soils and grow in very stressful conditions. The ranch elevations range from 1450 to 1600 feet above sea level, with near 360 degree exposure. A wide range of wildlife—including turkeys, mountain lions, and bear—inhabit this isolated location. This vineyard produces Cabernet Sauvignon, Merlot, and Cabernet Franc. The vineyard was planted in 1999, 2000, 2001, and 2003.
- Doggwood Vineyard (12.5 vineyard acres) is located near the ridgeline of the eastern hills of Napa Valley. Situated on moderate slopes in rocky, well drained sobrante loam soils, the vineyard gains diversity from its many types of slopes and exposures. This vineyard produces Chardonnay and Sauvignon Blanc. The vineyard was planted in 1999.
- Foster Road Vineyard (31.5 vineyard acres) is located on the northern edge of Carneros at the foot of the Napa Valley. The haire loam and forward-kidd complex soils and cool climate result in unique wines. This vineyard produces Chardonnay and Pinot Noir. The vineyard was planted in 1995, 1997, 1998, 2003, 2004, and 2005.
- Hill Ranch Vineyard (7.5 vineyard acres) is located on the western side of Napa Valley on the Rutherford Bench, widely regarded as one of the top Cabernet Sauvignon production locations in the world. This vineyard produces Cabernet Sauvignon exclusively. The vineyard was planted in 1991.
- Maple Lane Vineyard (32.5 vineyard acres) is located south of Calistoga in the hills of northern Napa Valley. The vines are planted on the valley floor and grow into well drained Perkins gravelly loam and bale loam soils. This vineyard produces Cabernet Sauvignon, Sauvignon Blanc, Merlot, Petit Verdot, and Malbec. The vineyard was planted in 2004.
