= Symbolic interactionism =

Sociological theory

Symbolic interactionism is a sociological theory that develops from practical considerations and alludes to humans' particular use of shared language to create common symbols and meanings, for use in both intra- and interpersonal communication.

It is particularly important in microsociology and social psychology. It is derived from the American philosophy of pragmatism and particularly from the work of George Herbert Mead, as a pragmatic method to interpret social interactions.

According to Mead, symbolic interactionism is "The ongoing use of language and gestures in anticipation of how the other will react; a conversation". Symbolic interactionism is "a framework for building theory that sees society as the product of everyday interactions of individuals". In other words, it is a frame of reference to better understand how individuals interact with one another to create symbolic 'worlds', and in return, how these symbolic 'worlds' shape individual behaviors. It is a framework that helps understand how society is preserved and created through repeated interactions between individuals. The interpretation process that occurs between interactions helps create and recreate meaning. It is the shared understanding and interpretations of meaning that affect the interaction between individuals. Individuals act on the premise of a shared understanding of meaning within their social context. Thus, interaction and behavior are framed through the shared meaning that objects and concepts have attached to them. Symbolic Interactionism refers to both verbal and nonverbal communication. From this view, people live in both natural and symbolic environments.

== History ==
=== George Herbert Mead ===
Symbolic interaction was conceived by George Herbert Mead and Charles Horton Cooley. Mead was born in South Hadley, Massachusetts in the year 1863. Mead was influenced by many theoretical and philosophical traditions, such as, utilitarianism, evolutionism, pragmatism, behaviorism, and the looking-glass-self. Mead was a social constructionist. Mead argued that people's selves are social products, but that these selves are also purposive and creative, and believed that the true test of any theory was that it was "useful in solving complex social problems". Mead's influence was said to be so powerful that sociologists regard him as the one "true founder" of the symbolic interactionism tradition.

Although Mead taught in a philosophy department, he is best known by sociologists as the teacher who trained a generation of the best minds in their field. Strangely, he never set forth his wide-ranging ideas in a book or systematic treatise. Mead began his teachings at the University of Michigan then moved to the University of Chicago. After his death in 1931, his students pulled together class notes and conversations with their mentor and published Mind, Self and Society in his name. It is a common misconception that John Dewey was the leader of this sociological theory; according to The Handbook of Symbolic Interactionism, Mead was undoubtedly the individual who "transformed the inner structure of the theory, moving it to a higher level of theoretical complexity."

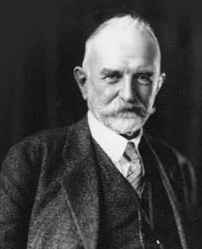
George Herbert Mead

Mind, Self and Society is the book published by Mead's students based on his lectures and teaching, and the title of the book highlights the core concept of social interactionism. Mind refers to an individual's ability to use symbols to create meanings for the world around the individual – individuals use language and thought to accomplish this goal. Self refers to an individual's ability to reflect on the way that the individual is perceived by others. Finally, society, according to Mead, is where all of these interactions are taking place. A general description of Mead's compositions portray how outside social structures, classes, and power and abuse affect the advancement of self, personality for gatherings verifiably denied of the ability to characterize themselves.

=== Herbert Blumer ===
Herbert Blumer, a student and interpreter of Mead, coined the term and put forward an influential summary: people act a certain way towards things based on the meaning those things already have, and these meanings are derived from social interaction and modified through interpretation. Blumer was a social constructionist, and was influenced by John Dewey; as such, this theory is very phenomenologically-based. Given that Blumer was the first to use symbolic interaction as a term, he is known as the founder of symbolic interaction. He believed that the "Most human and humanizing activity that people engage in is talking to each other." According to Blumer, human groups are created by people, and it is only the actions between them that define a society. He argued that with interaction and through interaction, individuals are able to "produce common symbols by approving, arranging, and redefining them." Having said that, interaction is shaped by a mutual exchange of interpretation, the ground of socialization.

=== Other theorists ===
While having less influential work in the discipline, Charles Horton Cooley and William Isaac Thomas are considered to be influential representatives of the theory. Cooley's work on connecting society and the individuals influenced Mead's further workings. Cooley felt society and the individuals could only be understood in relationship to each other. Cooley's concept of the "looking-glass self," influenced Mead's theory of self and symbolic interactionism. W. I. Thomas is also known as a representative of symbolic interactionism. His main work was a theory of human motivation addressing interactions between individuals and the "social sources of behaviors." He attempted to "explain the proper methodological approach to social life; develop a theory of human motivation; spell out a working conception of adult socialization; and provide the correct perspective on deviance and disorganization." A majority of scholars agree with Thomas.

Two other theorists who have influenced symbolic interaction theory are Yrjö Engeström and David Middleton. Engeström and Middleton explained the usefulness of symbolic interactionism in the communication field in a variety of work settings, including "courts of law, health care, computer software design, scientific laboratory, telephone sales, control, repair, and maintenance of advanced manufacturing systems". Other scholars credited for their contribution to the theory are Thomas, Park, James, Horton Cooley, Znaniecki, Baldwin, Redfield, and Wirth. Unlike other social sciences, symbolic interactionism emphasizes greatly on the ideas of action instead of culture, class and power. According to behaviorism, Darwinism, pragmatism, as well as Max Weber, action theory contributed significantly to the formation of social interactionism as a theoretical perspective in communication studies.

== Assumptions, premises, and research methodology ==
=== Assumptions ===
Most symbolic interactionists believe a physical reality does indeed exist by an individual's social definitions, and that social definitions do develop in part or in relation to something "real". People thus do not respond to this reality directly, but rather to the social understanding of reality; i.e., they respond to this reality indirectly through a kind of filter which consists of individuals' different perspectives. This means that humans exist not in the physical space composed of realities, but in the "world" composed only of "objects". According to Erving Goffman, what motivates humans to position their body parts in certain manners and the desires to capture and examine those moments are two of the elements that constitute the composition of the social reality which is made of various individuals' perceptions, it's crucial to examine how these two elements occur. It appeals to symbolic interactionists to shift more emphases on the realistic aspect of their empirical observation and theorizing.

Three assumptions frame symbolic interactionism:

1. Individuals construct meaning via the communication process.
2. Self-concept is a motivation for behavior.
3. A unique relationship exists between the individual and society.

=== Premises ===
Having defined some of the underlying assumptions of symbolic interactionism, it is necessary to address the premises that each assumption supports. According to Blumer (19f,.69), there are three premises that can be derived from the assumptions above.

1) "Humans act toward things on the basis of the meanings they ascribe to those things."

The first premise includes everything that a human being may note in their world, including physical objects, actions and concepts. Essentially, individuals behave towards objects and others based on the personal meanings that the individual has already given these items. Meaning is not automatically associated, it is ascribed through interactions. Blumer was trying to put emphasis on the meaning behind individual behaviors, specifically speaking, psychological and sociological explanations for those actions and behaviors.

2) "The meaning of such things is derived from, or arises out of, the social interaction that one has with others and the society."

The second premise explains the meaning of such things is derived from, or arises out of, the social interaction that one has with other humans. Blumer, following Mead, claimed people interact with each other by interpreting or defining each other's actions instead of merely reacting to each other's actions. Their "response" is not made directly to the actions of one another but instead is based on the meaning which they attach to such actions. Thus, human interaction is mediated by the use of symbols and signification, by interpretation, or by ascertaining the meaning of one another's actions. Mead believed not in stimulus-response, but in stimulus-interpretation-response. The meaning we assign to our communication is what is important. Meaning is either taken for granted and pushed aside as an unimportant element which need not be investigated, or it is regarded as a mere neutral link or one of the causal chains between the causes or factors responsible for human behavior and this behavior as the product of such factors.

3) "The Meanings are handled in, and modified through, an interpretative process used by the person in dealing with the things he/she [sic] encounters."

Symbolic interactionists describe thinking as an inner conversation. Mead called this inner dialogue minding, which is the delay in one's thought process that happens when one thinks about what they will do next. These meanings are handled in, and modified through, an interpretive process (Note: This process occurs in the form of interaction with oneself or taking into account of taking into account.) used by the person in dealing with the things that they encounter. We naturally talk to ourselves in order to sort out the meaning of a difficult situation. But first, we need language. Before we can think, we must be able to interact symbolically. The emphasis on symbols, negotiated meaning, and social construction of society brought attention to the roles people play. Role-taking is a key mechanism that permits people to see another person's perspective to understand what an action might mean to another person. Role-taking is a part of our lives at an early age, for instance, playing house and pretending to be someone else. There is an improvisational quality to roles; however, actors often take on a script that they follow. Because of the uncertainty of roles in social contexts, the burden of role-making is on the person in the situation. In this sense, we are proactive participants in our environment.

Some theorists have proposed an additional fourth premise:

4) "It's the inherent human desire to acquire potential psychological rewards from interacting with others that motivates us to establish realities filtered through social interactions"

Some symbolic interactionists point out the ineradicable nexus of the desire for potential psychological reward between individuals and their respective socially constructed realities that is commonly known as the "society", these experts have confirmed that one crucial premise for analyzing and dissecting symbolic interactionism is the psychological reward that drives individuals to connect with others and create meanings via social interactions. We as humans instinctively discern individuals whom we want to be associated with, before we initiate an interaction with them, we would experience an internal emotional rush biologically that encourages us to initiate the interaction, thus beginning to form various socially constructed realities that enables symbolic interactionism to examine, namely it's our desires for emotional rewards that makes the theory of symbolic interactionism possible and viable.

=== Research methodology ===
The majority of interactionist research uses qualitative research methods, like participant observation, to study aspects of social interaction, and/or individuals' selves. Participant observation allows researchers to access symbols and meanings, as in Howard Becker's Art Worlds and Arlie Hochschild's The Managed Heart. They argue that close contact and immersion in the everyday activities of the participants is necessary for understanding the meaning of actions, defining situations and the process that actors construct the situation through their interaction. Because of this close contact, interactions cannot remain completely liberated of value commitments. In most cases, they make use of their values in choosing what to study; however, they seek to be objective in how they conduct the research. Therefore, the symbolic-interaction approach is a micro-level orientation focusing on human interaction in specific situations.

== Five central ideas ==
There are five central ideas to symbolic interactionism according to Joel M. Charon (2004):

1. "The human being must be understood as a social person. It is the constant search for social interaction that leads us to do what we do. Instead of focusing on the individual and his or her personality, or on how the society or social situation causes human behavior, symbolic interactionism focuses on the activities that take place between actors. Interaction is the basic unit of study. Individuals are created through interaction; society too is created through social interaction. What we do depends on interaction with others earlier in our lifetimes, and it depends on our interaction right now. Social interaction is central to what we do. If we want to understand cause, focus on social interaction.
2. The human being must be understood as a thinking being. Human action is not only interaction among individuals but also interaction within the individual. It is not our ideas or attitudes or values that are as important as the constant active ongoing process of thinking. We are not simply conditioned, we are not simply beings who are influenced by those around us, we are not simply products of society. We are, to our very core, thinking animals, always conversing with ourselves as we interact with others. If we want to understand cause, focus on human thinking.
3. Humans do not sense their environment directly; instead, humans define the situation they are in. An environment may actually exist, but it is our definition of it that is important. Definition does not simply randomly happen; instead, it results from ongoing social interaction and thinking.
4. The cause of human action is the result of what is occurring in our present situation. Cause unfolds in the present social interaction, present thinking, and present definition. It is not society's encounters with us in our past that causes action, nor is it our own past experience that does. It is, instead, social interaction, thinking, definition of the situation that takes place in the present. Our past enters into our actions primarily because we think about it and apply it to the definition of the present situation.
5. Human beings are described as active beings in relation to their environment. Words such as conditioning, responding, controlled, imprisoned, and formed are not used to describe the human being in symbolic interaction. In contrast to other social-scientific perspectives humans are not thought of as being passive in relation to their surroundings, but actively involved in what they do."

== Central interactionist themes ==
To Blumer's conceptual perspective, he put them in three core propositions: that people act toward things, including each other, on the basis of the meanings they have for them; that these meanings are derived through social interaction with others; and that these meanings are managed and transformed through an interpretive process that people use to make sense of and handle the objects that constitute their social worlds. This perspective can also be described as three core principles- Meaning, Language and Thinking- in which social constructs are formed. The principle of meaning is the center of human behavior. Language provides meaning by providing means to symbols. These symbols differentiate social relations of humans from that of animals. By humans giving meaning to symbols, they can express these things with language. In turn, symbols form the basis of communication. Symbols become imperative components for the formation of any kind of communicative act. Thinking then changes the interpretation of individuals as it pertains to symbols.

Some symbolic interactionists like Goffman had pointed out the obvious defects of the pioneering Mead concept upon which the contemporary symbolic interactionism is built, it has influenced the modern symbolic interactionism to be more conducive to conceiving "social-psychological concerns rather than sociological concerns". For instance, during analyzing symbolic interactionism, the participants' emotional fluctuations that are inexorably entailed are often ignored because they are too sophisticated and volatile to measure. When the participants are being selected to participate in certain activities that are not part of their normal daily routine, it will inevitably disrupt the participants psychologically, causing spontaneous thoughts to flow that are very likely to make the participants veer away from their normal behaviors. These psychological changes could result in the participants' emotional fluctuations that manifest themselves in the participants' reactions; therefore, manufacturing biases that will the previously mentioned biases. This critique unveiled the lack of scrutiny on participants' internal subjective processing of their environment which initiates the reasoning and negotiating faculties, which the contemporary symbolic interactionism also reflects. Henceforth, prejudice is not a purely psychological phenomenon, instead it can be interpreted from a symbolic interactionism standpoint, taking individuals' construction of the social reality into account.

=== Principles ===
Keeping Blumer's earlier work in mind David A. Snow, professor of sociology at the University of California, Irvine, suggests four broader and even more basic orienting principles: human agency, interactive determination, symbolization, and emergence. Snow uses these four principles as the thematic bases for identifying and discussing contributions to the study of social movements.

1. Human agency: emphasizes the active, willful, goal-seeking character of human actors. The emphasis on agency focuses attention on those actions, events, and moments in social life in which agentic action is especially palpable.
2. Interactive determination: specifies that understanding of focal objects of analysis, whether they are self-concepts, identities, roles, practices, or even social movements. Basically this means, neither individual, society, self, or others exist only in relation to each other and therefore can be fully understood only in terms of their interaction.
3. Symbolization: highlights the processes through which events and conditions, artifacts, people, and other environmental features that take on particular meanings, becoming nearly only objects of orientation. Human behavior is partly contingent on what the object of orientation symbolizes or means.
4. Emergence: focuses on attention on the processual and non-habituated side of social life, focusing not only on organization and texture of social life, but also associated meaning and feelings. The principle of emergence points us not only to the possibility of new forms of social life and system meaning but also to transformations in existing forms of social organization.

== Applications ==
Symbolic interaction can be used to explain one's identity in terms of roles being "ideas and principles on 'what to do' in a given situation," as noted by Hewitt. Symbolic Interactionist identity presents in 3 categories- situated, personal and social. Situated identity refers to the ability to view themselves as others do. This is often a snapshot view in that it is short, but can be very impactful. From this experience, one wishes to differentiate themselves from others and the personal identity comes to exist. This view is when one wishes to make themselves known for who they truly are, not the view of others. From the personal identity taking place, comes the social identity where connections and likeness are made with individuals sharing similar identities or identity traits.

This viewpoint of symbolic interactionism can be applied to the use of social networking sites and how one's identity is presented on those sites. With social networking sites, one can boast (or post) their identity through their newsfeed. The personal identity presents itself in the need for individuals to post milestones that one has achieved, in efforts to differentiate themselves. The social identity presents itself when individuals "tag" others in their posts, pictures, etc. Situated identities may be present in the need to defend something on social media or arguments that occur in comments, where one feels it necessary to "prove" themselves.

Coming from the viewpoint that we learn, or at least desire, how to expect other people's reactions/responses to things, Bruce Link and his colleagues studied how expectations of the reactions of others can affect the mental illness stigma. The participants of the study were individuals with psychosis who answered questions relating to discrimination, stigma, and rejection. The goal of the study was to determine whether others' expectations affect the participants' internalized stigmas, anticipated rejection, concerns with staying in, and other. Results found that high levels of internalized stigma were only present in the minority, however, anticipation of rejection, stigma consciousness, perceived devaluation discrimination and concerns with staying in were found to be more prevalent in participants. These perceptions were correlated with the outcomes of withdrawal, self-esteem and isolation from relatives. The study found that anticipation of rejection played the largest role in internalized stigmas.

Applications on social roles

Symbolic interactionism can be used to dissect the concept of social role and further study relations between friends. A social role begins to exist when an individual initiates interaction with other people who would comprise a social circle in which the initiator is the central terminal, the accumulated proceedings of duties and rights performed by the central person and all the other participants in this social circle reinforces this dynamic circle. Apart from the central role, such social groups are constituted of participants who benefit from the central figure and those who are eligible and capable of helping the central role to achieve its envisioned objectives. The roles in the social role dynamic aren't preordained although the prevalent culture of a specific society usually possesses a default structure to most social roles. Despite the fact that the predominant culture of a certain society typically exerts large amount of influence on the instinctive formation of the structures in social groups, the roles in social groups are eventually formed based on the interactions occurred between the central figure and other potential participants in this role. For illustration, if a central person of the social role is a police officer, then this social role can contain victims, teammates, operators, the dispatch, potential suspects, lieutenant. Social roles could be formulated by happenstances, but it can't escape the inexorable reconfiguration of multilateral exchanges of each role's obligations in a social role. (Lopata 1964). Through this lens, the examination of various social roles becomes more receptive and accessible, which also possesses the same effects on examining friendship and other vocations.

== Criticisms ==
Symbolic interactionists are often criticized for being overly impressionistic in their research methods and somewhat unsystematic in their theories. It is argued that the theory is not one theory, but rather, the framework for many different theories. Additionally, some theorists have a problem with symbolic interaction theory due to its lack of testability. These objections, combined with the fairly narrow focus of interactionist research on small-group interactions and other social psychological issues, have relegated the interactionist camp to a minority position among sociologists (albeit a fairly substantial minority). Much of this criticism arose during the 1970s in the U.S. when quantitative approaches to sociology were dominant, and perhaps the best known of these is by Alvin Gouldner.

=== Framework and theories ===
Some critiques of symbolic interactionism are based on the assumption that it is a theory, and the critiques apply the criteria for a "good" theory to something that does not claim to be a theory. Some critics find the symbolic interactionist framework too broad and general when they are seeking specific theories. Symbolic interactionism is a theoretical framework rather than a theory (Note: see: Stryker and Vryan (2006) for a clear distinction between the two as it pertains to interactionist-inspired conceptualizations.) and can be assessed on the basis of effective conceptualizations. The theoretical framework, as with any theoretical framework, is vague when it comes to analyzing empirical data or predicting outcomes in social life. As a framework rather than a theory, many scholars find it difficult to use. Interactionism being a framework rather than a theory makes it impossible to test interactionism in the manner that a specific theoretical claim about the relationship between specific variables in a given context allows. Unlike the symbolic interactionist framework, the many theories derived from symbolic interactionism, such as role theory and the versions of identity theory developed by Sheldon Stryker, as well as Peter Burke and colleagues, clearly define concepts and the relationships between them in a given context, thus allowing for the opportunity to develop and test hypotheses. Further, especially among Blumerian processual interactionists, a great number of very useful conceptualizations have been developed and applied in a very wide range of social contexts, types of populations, types of behaviors, and cultures and subcultures.

=== Social structure ===
Symbolic interactionism is often related and connected with social structure. This concept suggests that symbolic interactionism is a construction of people's social reality. It also implies that from a realistic point of view, the interpretations that are being made will not make much difference. When the reality of a situation is defined, the situation becomes a meaningful reality. This includes methodological criticisms, and critical sociological issues. A number of symbolic interactionists have addressed these topics, the best known being Stryker's structural symbolic interactionism and the formulations of interactionism heavily influenced by this approach (sometimes referred to as the "Indiana School" of symbolic interactionism), including the works of key scholars in sociology and psychology using different methods and theories applying a structural version of interactionism that are represented in a 2003 collection edited by Burke et al. Another well-known structural variation of symbolic interactionism that applies quantitative methods is Manford H. Kuhn's formulation which is often referred to in sociological literature as the "Iowa School." Negotiated order theory also applies a structural approach.

==== Language ====
Language is viewed as the source of all meaning. Blumer illuminates several key features about social interactionism. Most people interpret things based on assignment and purpose. The interaction occurs once the meaning of something has become identified. This concept of meaning is what starts to construct the framework of social reality. By aligning social reality, Blumer suggests that language is the meaning of interaction. Communication, especially in the form of symbolic interactionism is connected with language. Language initiates all forms of communication, verbal and non-verbal. Blumer defines this source of meaning as a connection that arises out of the social interaction that people have with each other.

==== Critical perspective ====
According to social theorist Patricia Burbank, the concepts of synergistic and diverging properties are what shape the viewpoints of humans as social beings. These two concepts are different in a sense because of their views of human freedom and their level of focus. According to Burbank, actions are based on the effects of situations that occur during the process of social interaction. Another important factor in meaningful situations is the environment in which the social interaction occurs. The environment influences interaction, which leads to a reference group and connects with perspective, and then concludes to a definition of the situation. This illustrates the proper steps to define a situation. An approval of the action occurs once the situation is defined. An interpretation is then made upon that action, which may ultimately influence the perspective, action, and definition.

Stryker emphasizes that the sociology world at large is the most viable and vibrant intellectual framework. By being made up of our thoughts and self-belief, the social interactionism theory is the purpose of all human interaction, and is what causes society to exist. This fuels criticisms of the symbolic interactionist framework for failing to account for social structure, as well as criticisms that interactionist theories cannot be assessed via quantitative methods, and cannot be falsifiable or tested empirically. Framework is important for the symbolic interaction theory because in order for the social structure to form, there are certain bonds of communication that need to be established to create the interaction. Much of the symbolic interactionist framework's basic tenets can be found in a very wide range of sociological and psychological work, without being explicitly cited as interactionist, making the influence of symbolic interactionism difficult to recognize given this general acceptance of its assumptions as "common knowledge."

Another problem with this model is two-fold, in that it 1) does not take into account human emotions very much, implying that symbolic interaction is not completely psychological; and 2) is interested in social structure to a limited extent, implying that symbolic interaction is not completely sociological. These incompetencies frame meaning as something that occurs naturally within an interaction under a certain condition, rather than taking into account the basic social context in which interaction is positioned. From this view, meaning has no source and does not perceive a social reality beyond what humans create with their own interpretations.

Another criticism of symbolic interactionism is more so on the scholars themselves. They are noted to not take interest in the history of this sociological approach. This has the ability to produce shallow understanding and can make the subject "hard to teach" based on the lack of organization in its teachings to relate with other theories or studies.

=== Limitations ===
Some symbolic interactionists like Goffman had pointed out the obvious defects of the pioneering Mead concept upon which the contemporary symbolic interactionism is built, it has influenced the modern symbolic interactionism to be more conducive to conceiving "social-psychological concerns rather than sociological concerns". For instance, during analyzing symbolic interactionism, the participants' emotional fluctuations that are inexorably entailed are often ignored because they are too sophisticated and volatile to measure. When the participants are being selected to participate in certain activities that are not part of their normal daily routine, it will inevitably disrupt the participants psychologically, causing spontaneous thoughts to flow that are very likely to make the participants veer away from their normal behaviors. These psychological changes could result in the participants' emotional fluctuations that manifest themselves in the participants' reactions; therefore, manufacturing biases that will the previously mentioned biases. This critique unveiled the lack of scrutiny on participants' internal subjective processing of their environment which initiates the reasoning and negotiating faculties, which the contemporary symbolic interactionism also reflects. Henceforth, prejudice is not a purely psychological phenomenon, instead it can be interpreted from a symbolic interactionism standpoint, taking individuals' construction of the social reality into account.

== Society for the Study of Symbolic Interaction ==
The Society for the Study of Symbolic Interaction (SSSI) is an international professional organization for scholars, who are interested in the study of symbolic interaction. SSSI holds a conference in conjunction with the meeting of the American Sociological Association (ASA) and the Society for the Study of Social Problems. This conference typically occurs in August and sponsors the SSSI holds the Couch-Stone Symposium each spring. The Society provides travel scholarships for student members interested in attending the annual conference. At the annual conference, the SSSI sponsors yearly awards in different categories of symbolic interaction. Additionally, some of the awards are open to student members of the society. The Ellis-Bochner Autoethnography and Personal Narrative Research Award is given annually by the SSSI affiliate of the National Communication Association for the best article, essay, or book chapter in autoethnography and personal narrative research. The award is named after renowned autoethnographers Carolyn Ellis and Art Bochner. The society also sponsors a quarterly journal, Symbolic Interaction, and releases a newsletter, SSSI Notes.

SSSI also has a European branch, which organizes an annual conference that integrates European symbolic interactionists.

== See also ==
- Constructivism (learning theory)
- Coordinated management of meaning
- Edward T. Hall
- Erving Goffman
- Extension transference
- Generalized other
- Georg Simmel
- Labeling theory
- Interactionism
- Sandbox play therapy
- Social action
- Symbolic behavior

== Works cited ==
- Blumer, Herbert. 1973. "A note on symbolic interactionism." American Sociological Review 38(6).
- Burbank, Patricia. 3 Jan 2010. "Symbolic Interactionism and Critical Perspective: Divergent or Synergistic?." Nursing Philosophy.
- Prus, Robert. 1996. Symbolic Interaction and Ethnographic Research: Intersubjectivity and the Study of Human Lived Experience. Albany, NY: State University of New York Press.
- Stryker, Sheldon. 1999. "The vitalization of symbolic interactionism." Social Psychology Quarterly 50:83. Web.
- Berger, C. R. & Calabrese, R. J. (1975). Some explorations in initial interaction and beyond: Toward a developmental theory of interpersonal communication.
- Afifi, W. A. & Weiner, J. L. (2004). Toward a theory of motivated information management. Communication Theory, 14, 167-190.
- Husin, S. S., Rahman, A. a. A., & Mukhtar, D. (2021). THE SYMBOLIC INTERACTIONISM THEORY: A SYSTEMATIC LITERATURE REVIEW OF CURRENT RESEARCH. International Journal of Modern Trends in Social Sciences, 4(17), 113–126. https://doi.org/10.35631/ijmtss.417010
- Azarian, R. (2021). Analytical Sociology and Symbolic interactionism: bridging the intra-disciplinary divide. The American Sociologist, 52(3), 530–547. https://doi.org/10.1007/s12108-021-09484-2
- Symbolic Interactionism: The Basics [E-book, PDF]. (2019). In Vernon Press eBooks. https://doi.org/10.54094/b-5691646dff
- Reynolds, L. T., & Herman-Kinney, N. J. (2003). Handbook of Symbolic Interactionism. Rowman Altamira.
- Mead, G. H. (2015). Mind, self, and society: The Definitive Edition. University of Chicago Press.
- Blumer, H. (1986). Symbolic interactionism: Perspective and Method. Univ of California Press.
- Hewitt, J. P., & Shulman, D. (2011). Self and society: A Symbolic Interactionist Social Psychology. Prentice Hall.
- Harter, S. (1999). Symbolic Interactionism Revisited: Potential Liabilities for the Self Constructed in the Crucible of Interpersonal Relationships. Merrill-Palmer Quarterly, 45(4), 677–703.
- Lundgren, D. C. (2004). Social feedback and self-appraisals: Current status of the Mead-Cooley hypothesis. Symbolic Interaction, 27(2), 267–286.
- Holdsworth, C., & Morgan, D. (2007). Revisiting the generalized other: an exploration. Sociology, 41(3), 401–417. https://doi.org/10.1177/0038038507076614
- O’Brien, J. (2006). The production of reality: Essays and Readings on Social Interaction. Pine Forge Press.
- Hall, P. M. (1980). Structuring Symbolic Interaction: Communication and Power. Annals of the International Communication Association, 4(1), 49–60.
- Stryker, S. (2008). From mead to a structural symbolic interactionism and beyond. Annual Review of Sociology, 34(1), 15–31. https://doi.org/10.1146/annurev.soc.34.040507.134649
