= W.E.B. Du Bois Career of Distinguished Scholarship Award =

Sociology award given by the American Sociological Association

The W.E.B. Du Bois Career of Distinguished Scholarship Award is given annually by the American Sociological Association to a scholar among its members, whose cumulative body of work constitutes a significant contribution to the advancement of sociology. Formerly called simply the Career of Distinguished Scholarship Award, the award was renamed in 2006 to honor pioneering American sociologist W. E. B. Du Bois.

== List of recipients ==
- 1980 – Robert K. Merton
- 1981 – Everett C. Hughes
- 1982 – Kingsley Davis
- 1983 – Herbert Blumer
- 1984 – Morris Janowitz
- 1985 – Reinhard Bendix
- 1986 – Edward A. Shils
- 1987 – Wilbert E. Moore
- 1988 – George C. Homans
- 1989 – Jessie Bernard
- 1990 – Robin M. Williams Jr.
- 1991 – Mirra Komarovsky
- 1992 – Daniel Bell
- 1993 – Joan Acker
- 1994 – Lewis A. Coser
- 1995 – Leo Goodman
- 1996 – Peter Blau
- 1997 – William H. Sewell
- 1998 – Howard S. Becker
- 1999 – Dorothy E. Smith
- 2000 – Seymour Martin Lipset
- 2001 – William Foote Whyte
- 2002 – Gerhard Lenski
- 2003 – Immanuel Wallerstein
- 2004 – Arthur Stinchcombe
- 2005 – Charles Tilly and Charles V. Willie
- 2006 – Herbert J. Gans
- 2007 – Joseph Berger
- 2008 – Barbara Reskin
- 2009 – Sheldon Stryker
- 2010 – Alejandro Portes
- 2011 – Harrison White
- 2012 – William A. Gamson
- 2013 – Joe Feagin
- 2014 – William Julius Wilson
- 2015 – John W. Meyer
- 2016 – Glen Elder
- 2017 – Patricia Hill Collins
- 2018 – Elijah Anderson
- 2019 – Harvey L. Molotch
- 2020 - Aldon Morris
- 2021 - Eduardo Bonilla-Silva
- 2022 - Mary Romero
- 2023 - Viviana A. Zelizer
- 2024 - Michael Burawoy
- 2025 - David A. Snow
- 2026 - Arne L. Kalleberg

== See also ==
- List of social sciences awards
