= Georgina Lawton =

British writer (born 1992)

- Born: 1992 (age 33–34); Shepherd's Bush, London, England
- Education: University of Warwick

Georgina Lawton (born 1992) is a British writer. Her personal narrative is the subject of the non-fiction book Raceless: In Search of Family, Identity, and the Truth About Where I Belong (2021). The book explores Lawton's experience of being mixed-black with two white Irish and English parents and discovering she was the product of a brief affair.

Lawton had a column in the Guardian Weekend and presented the podcast The Secrets in Us, which won bronze at the 2021 British Podcast Awards and gold at the NY Radio Awards.

== Birth and childhood ==
Lawton's Irish mother and English father met in London while working at a Charing Cross hotel and married in 1990. Lawton was born shortly afterwards in Shepherd's Bush in 1992. A midwife explained the child's dark skin as a "throwback gene" to Spanish Armada sailors shipwrecked off Ireland in the late 1500s, resulting in a darkening of bloodlines on the west coast of Ireland, notably in County Clare, where her mother was from.

Raised as a dark child of white parents led to insecurities from not meeting European beauty standards as a teen growing up in Sutton and Carshalton, suburbs of London. The refusal to address questions about her race and denial of her mixed-race identity ultimately led to her taking a DNA test after her father's death in 2015. It confirmed that he was not her biological father, and the secret her mother had kept of a brief liaison was no longer sustainable. The revelations led to her living in communities of colour in a search for identity. Lawton has said she relates to the terms Black British or Black British and Irish.

Lawton graduated with a Bachelor of Arts (BA) in English literature from the University of Warwick in 2014.

== Identity quest ==
The disconnect Lawton felt increased as she grew older, leading to Black communities in Nicaragua's Corn Islands, Cuba, Dominicana and Brooklyn where she travelled. It was while in the Corn Islands that Lawton confronted her mother back in the UK by phone with the results of her third DNA test, showing her to be 43% Nigerian, resulting in a flat refusal by her mother to acknowledge the taboo topic of her birth.

Currently a podcaster, Lawton previously wrote for The Guardian, where she was a columnist, and also for Refinery29, VICE News, The Times, Marie Claire, Stylist, Bustle, Time Out London and others. She lives in London, writing about travel, living, identity, and culture.

== Book reception ==
Lawton's first book, Raceless: In Search of Family, Identity, and the Truth About Where I Belong (ISBN 978-0063009486), was published on 23 February 2021. The book has been termed "a 'must read' for racially integrated families, especially those with children" in a review on Goodreads. In a review for The New York Times, Bliss Broyard said: 'Lawton’s discussion of racial passing, transracial adoption, mixed-race identity and the health implications of being misidentified are freshly fascinating. She is a particularly astute observer of the psychological dislocation caused by growing up mixed race in a white family who never acknowledged her racial identity, and she writes beautifully about questions of identity and belonging...'

In her book she explores the psychological dislocation which growing up had on a mixed race child whose white family ignored her racial identity, and also writes about identity and belonging, which brought about acceptance of her circumstance and relations with those she grew up around.

== Bibliography ==
- Raceless: In Search of Family, Identity, and the Truth About Where I Belong (2021; ISBN 978-0063009486)
