= Cecilia L. Ridgeway =

American sociologist

- Born: Edinburg, Texas
- Education: University of Michigan (BA); Cornell University (MA, PhD)
- Known for: Work on gender and social status
- Awards: 2005 Cooley-Mead Award and 2009 Jessie Bernard Award from the American Sociological Association
- Scientific career
- Fields: Sociology
- Workplaces: Stanford University
- Thesis: Affective Interaction as a Determinant of Musical Involvement (1972)

Cecilia L. Ridgeway is an American sociologist and the Lucie Stern Professor of Social Sciences, emerita in the Sociology Department at Stanford University. She is known for her research on gender and status processes, specifically on how large, societal-level gender and status inequalities are recreated in face-to-face interaction. Ridgeway served as president of the American Sociological Association in 2013. She also edited Social Psychology Quarterly from 2001 to 2003. She was elected a Member of the National Academy of Sciences in 2025.

== Education and career ==
Ridgeway received her bachelor's degree with honors and distinction in sociology from the University of Michigan in 1967. She went on to receive her master's and PhD in sociology and social psychology from Cornell University in 1969 and 1972 respectively. She taught at the University of Wisconsin-Milwaukee from 1972 to 1985, attaining the rank of associate professor in 1978. She went on to teach at the University of Iowa from 1985 to 1991, acclaimed by her colleagues for her contributions to the social psychology program there. Her current position is at Stanford University.

== Contributions ==
Ridgeway's contributions to the field starts with her publications on status and expectation states theory. Ridgeway's research explored the emergence of social hierarchies through socially valid status symbols and nonverbal dominance cues. Ridgeway's most significant contribution to status research was her creation of and subsequent empirical tests of status construction theory. The theory argues that social differences between people can become treated as bases of status inequality when 1) resource inequality exists between people who differ on a social category (e.g., men and women) and 2) when members of the lower-resource category are less influential in social encounters than members of the high-resource group. When both occur, a person is likely to adopt status beliefs about members of these groups generally. Status beliefs refer to the conceptions of social value (e.g., perceived competence or honor) that are widely held about groups based on status markers such as sex or ethnicity. Ridgeway's work has been used to further research on inequality and the creation/perpetuation of inequality based on ones perceived status within society.

Ridgeway is also known for her work on gender, and how it operates as a source of status. Her book, Framed by Gender: How Gender Inequality Persists in the Modern World, argues that gender is a fundamental social category that people use to relate to one another in social interaction. She argues gender stereotypes are so hard to change (and consequently gender inequality is so stable) because gender stereotypes are so frequently recreated and validated by other people in repeated face-to-face encounters.

== Awards ==
Ridgeway received the Cooley-Mead Award from the American Sociological Association in 2005 for her career contributions to social psychology. In 2009, Ridgeway received the Jessie Bernard Award for her work on gender inequality and her mentorship of younger, female academics. She won the Distinguished Feminist Lecturer Award from the Sociologists for Women in Society due to her feminist scholarship in 2008. In 2012, her book, Framed by Gender: How Gender Inequality Persists in the Modern World, received the Outstanding Recent Contribution In Social Psychology Award from the Social Psychology Section of the American Sociological Association.

== Selected bibliography ==
=== Notable books ===
- Ridgeway, C. L. (2011). Framed by gender: how gender inequality persists in the modern world. New York: Oxford University Press.

=== Notable articles ===
- Ridgeway, C. L. (1991). The Social Construction of Status Value: Gender and Other Nominal Characteristics. Social Forces, 70(2), 367–386. https://doi.org/10.1093/sf/70.2.367
- Ridgeway, C. L. (1997). Interaction and the Conservation of Gender Inequality: Considering Employment. American Sociological Review, 62(2), 218–235. https://www.jstor.org/stable/2657301
- Ridgeway, C. L. (2014). Why Status Matters for Inequality. American Sociological Review, 79(1), 1–16. https://doi.org/10.1177/0003122413515997
- Ridgeway, C. L., and Correll, S. J. (2004) Unpacking the Gender System: A Theoretical Perspective on Gender Beliefs and Social Relations. Gender & Society, 18(4), 510–531.
