= Howard S. Becker =

American sociologist (1928–2023)

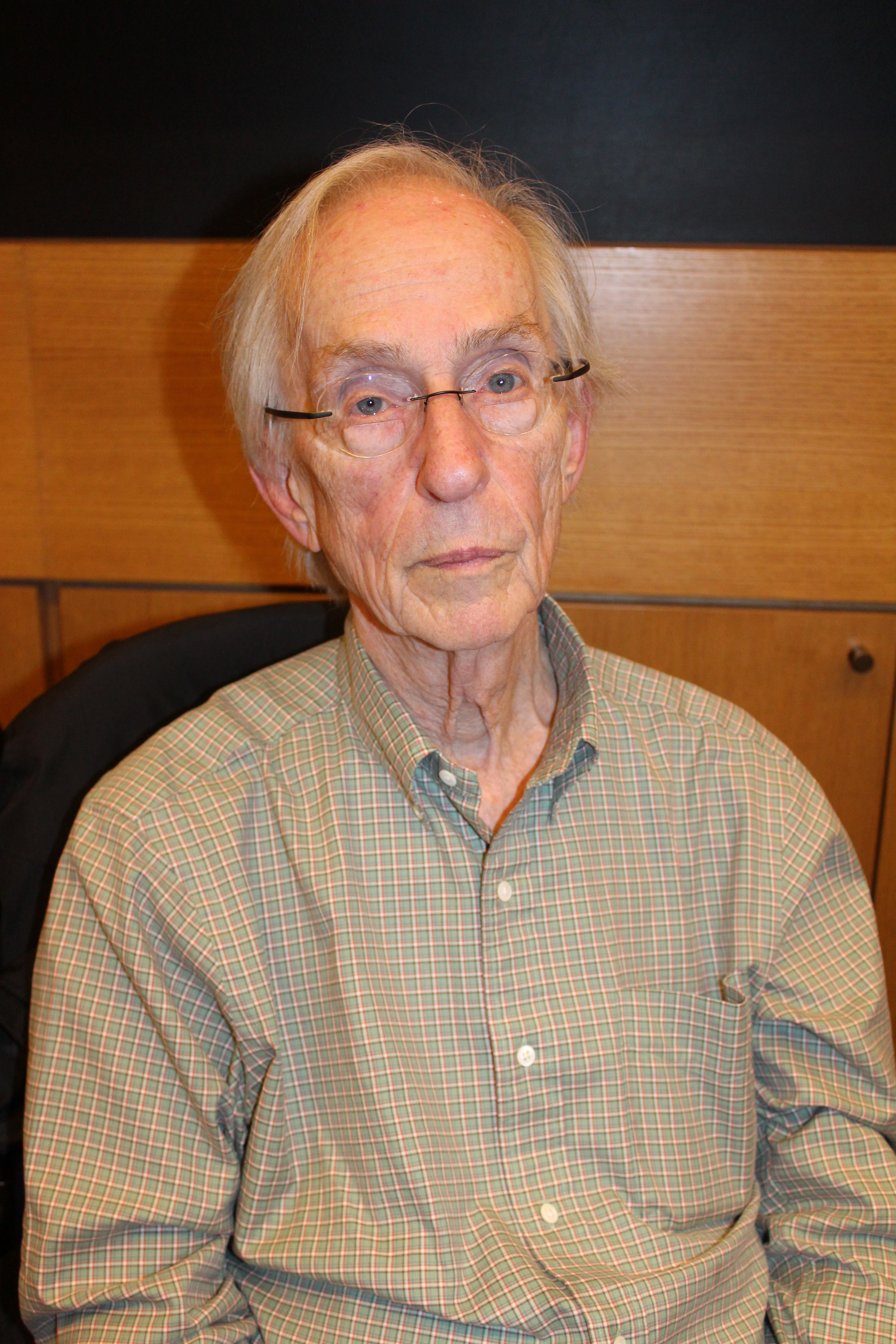
- Becker in 2012
- Born: Howard Saul Becker; April 18, 1928; Chicago, Illinois, U.S.
- Died: August 16, 2023 (aged 95); San Francisco, California, U.S.
- Other name: Howie Becker
- Spouse: Dianne Hagaman

Academic background
- Education: University of Chicago
- Thesis: Role and Career Problems of the Chicago Public School Teacher (1951)
- Academic advisor: Everett Hughes
- Influences: Herbert Blumer; Donald T. Campbell

Academic work
- Discipline: Sociology
- Sub-discipline: Medical sociology; sociology of art; sociology of deviance
- School or tradition: Chicago school; symbolic interactionism
- Institutions: Northwestern University
- Doctoral students: Elijah Anderson; Mitchell Duneier
- Notable works: Outsiders (1963)

Howard Saul Becker (April 18, 1928 – August 16, 2023) was an American sociologist who taught at Northwestern University. Becker made contributions to the sociology of deviance, sociology of art, and sociology of music. Becker also wrote extensively on sociological writing styles and methodologies. Becker's 1963 book Outsiders provided the foundations for labeling theory. Becker was often called a symbolic interactionist or social constructionist, although he did not align himself with either method. A graduate of the University of Chicago, Becker was considered part of the second Chicago School of Sociology, which also includes Erving Goffman and Anselm Strauss.

== Biography ==
=== Early life and education ===
Howard Saul Becker was born into a Jewish family on April 18, 1928, in Chicago, Illinois, the son of Allan Becker (April 2, 1902 – March 27, 1988) and Donna Becker (born Bertha Goldberg; December 31, 1904 – 1997). His great-grandfather, Gershon Movsha Becker, immigrated to the United States from Lithuania. Becker began playing piano at an early age and by age 15 worked as a pianist in bars and strip joints and, later, with a campus band at Northwestern University. According to Becker, he was able to work semi-professionally because of World War II and the fact that most musicians over the age of 18 were drafted. It was through his work as a musician Becker first became exposed to drug culture, which he would later study.

Becker received his undergraduate degree in sociology at the University of Chicago in 1946. While in school, Becker continued to play piano semi-professionally. According to Becker, he viewed music as his career and sociology as a hobby. Even so, he went on to get both his MA and PhD in sociology from the University of Chicago where he wrote his doctoral dissertation on Chicago school teachers. At the University of Chicago, Becker was taught in the tradition of the original Chicago School of Sociology. Becker and his colleagues, including Erving Goffman and Anselm Strauss, would later be considered part of the "second Chicago School of Sociology".

The Chicago School of Sociology focused heavily on qualitative data analysis and worked with the city of Chicago as a laboratory. Much of Becker's early work was guided in the Chicago School tradition, in particular by Everett C. Hughes who served as Becker's mentor and advisor. Becker is also often labeled a symbolic interactionist, even though he doesn't accept the label. According to Becker, his academic lineage is Georg Simmel, Robert E. Park, and Everett Hughes.

After receiving his PhD at the age of 23, Becker studied marijuana use at the Institute for Juvenile Research. He was later awarded a Ford Foundation Postdoctoral Research Fellowship at the University of Illinois from 1953 to 1955, and then spent three years as a research associate at Stanford University's Institute for the Study of Human Problems before beginning his teaching career.

=== Teaching career ===
After receiving his doctorate at the University of Chicago, Becker worked for three years as an instructor in sociology and social sciences at the University of Chicago. In 1965, Becker became a professor of sociology at Northwestern University, where he taught until 1991. During his career at Northwestern, Becker also taught as a visiting professor at the University of Manchester and as a visiting scholar at the Museu Nacional in Rio de Janeiro. In 1991, Becker became a professor of sociology and, in 1996, an adjunct professor of music, at the University of Washington until he retired in 1999.

Becker was also the recipient of numerous awards and honors in his field. These include a Guggenheim Fellowship in 1978–1979, the Charles Horton Cooley Award, awarded by the Society for the Study of Symbolic Interaction, in 1980, the Common Wealth Award in 1981, the Cooley/Mead Award in the Section on Social Psychology, awarded by the American Sociological Association in 1985, the George Herbert Mead Award given by the Society for the Study of Symbolic Interaction in 1987, and the Award for a Career of Distinguished Scholarship, awarded by the American Sociological Association in 1998. Becker also holds honorary degrees from Université de Paris VIII, Université Pierre Mendès-France in Grenoble, Erasmus University in Rotterdam, and École Normale Supérieure Lettres et Sciences Humaines in Lyon.

=== Retirement and death ===
Becker later resided in San Francisco. He also spent three to four months out of the year in Europe, mostly in Paris. Although no longer teaching full-time, Becker continued to write and record music.

In 2004, Un sociologue en liberté: Lecture d'Howard S. Becker by French sociologist Alain Pessin was released in France. In the book, Pessin examines Becker's work and contributions to the field of sociology.

Howard S. Becker died in San Francisco on August 16, 2023, at the age of 95.

== Contributions ==
=== Sociology of deviance and labeling theory ===
Although Becker did not claim to be a deviancy specialist, his work on the subject is often cited by sociologists and criminologists studying deviance. Becker's 1963 book Outsiders is credited as one of the first books on labeling theory and its application to studies of deviance. Becker explored the theory in which deviance is simply a social construction used to persuade the public to fear and criminalize certain groups. A compilation of early essays on the subject, Outsiders outlines Becker's theories of deviance through two deviant groups; marijuana users and dance musicians. In the book, Becker defines deviance as "not a quality of a bad person but the result of someone defining someone's activity as bad."

Becker is widely known for his work on drug culture, particularly his studies on marijuana use. Chapters three and four of Outsiders, which were originally published in the American Journal of Sociology in 1953, examine how marijuana users come to be labeled as social deviants. Becker was inspired to write on the subject after reading Alfred Lindesmith's book Opium Addiction, updated and republished as Addiction and Opiates (1968). As a musician, Becker had first hand experience with drug culture and was able to obtain interview participants through his connections to the music scene. The first of the articles, "Becoming a Marihuana User", outlines how social interaction plays a role in learning to use and enjoy the effects of the drug. The second, "Marijuana Use and Social Control", describes how mechanisms of control serve to limit use of the drug and further label users as deviants. In the late 1960s, Becker wrote two additional articles on drug culture: "History, Culture and Subjective Experience: An Exploration of the Social Bases of Drug–Induced Experiences" and "Ending Campus Drug Incidents". Even though he has not written anything on drug culture since the 1970s, Becker is still widely recognized as an influential researcher in the field.

Another contribution Becker made to the sociology of deviance were his studies on deviant cultures. In Outsiders, Becker examined the formation of deviant cultures through his observations of musicians. The musicians, according to Becker, place themselves counter to non-musicians or "squares", which in turn strengthens and isolates them as a deviant culture. Another important contribution Becker makes through his studies of deviant culture is the concept of "deviant careers". In the case of musicians, Becker examines the consequences of an individual choosing an occupation that is already located within a deviant group and how this in turn labels the actor choosing the career as deviant. Becker's work on deviant careers is greatly influenced by the work of his mentor Everett Hughes.

Becker's work on deviance has solidified him as one of the founders of labeling theory. Labeling theory is based on the idea that a social deviant is not an inherently deviant individual, rather they become deviant because they are labeled as such. In the first chapter of Outsiders, Becker explains:

... social groups create deviance by making rules whose infraction creates deviance, and by applying those roles to particular people and labeling them as outsiders. From this point of view, deviance is not a quality of the act the person commits, but rather a consequence of the application by other of rules and sanctions to an "offender." The deviant is one to whom that label has been successfully applied; deviant behavior is behavior that people so label.

According to Becker, not all individuals who are labeled deviant must remain deviant, however once labeled deviant it becomes more likely an individual will take deviant paths. In 1973, Becker rereleased Outsiders with a final chapter titled "Labeling Theory Reconsidered." In the chapter, Becker responds to critics who argue that labeling theory fails to provide an etiological explanation of deviance or an explanation of how individuals come to commit deviant acts in the first place. Becker explains that the theory was not meant to be taken as an overarching theory of deviance, nor was it meant to explain deviant behaviors as simply the product of outside influence. Rather, labeling theory was meant to "focus attention on the way labeling places the actor in circumstances which make it harder for him to continue the normal routines of everyday life and thus provoke him to "abnormal" actions."

=== Sociology of art ===
After writing his dissertation, Becker grew an interest in the sociological study of art. Becker believed that the field was underdeveloped and consisted mainly of thinly veiled value judgements of particular artists. Unlike previous work in the sociology of art, Becker approached art as "collective action" and studied art as an occupation.

One of Becker's main contributions to the field was the idea of art as a product of collective action. In his 1982 book Art Worlds, Becker describes how a work of art is formed through the coordination of many individuals. According to Becker, without each of the individuals who produce materials necessary to construct art, it becomes difficult if not impossible to create art. Becker also references how the division of labor plays a role in the creation of artwork, in that the work of many individuals goes into the production of the tools and routines of the artist. In addition to the tools necessary for the process of creation, Becker also emphasizes the role that shared meaning plays in ascribing value to art. In other words, Becker believes without a common understanding of a work's value, it is difficult for it to have any social resonance.

In addition to Art Worlds, Becker has written numerous essays on the sociology of art. Two volumes of these essays have been translated in French; Paroles et Musique and Propos sur l'art. Also, in 2006, Becker edited and contributed to Art from Start to Finish, a compilation of sociological essays addressing the question of how an artists decides when a work is finished. Along with his writings on the subject, Becker also taught a course on the sociology of art.

=== Writing style and methodology ===
In addition to Becker's contributions to sociological theory, he has also written extensively on the practice of sociology. In Writing for Social Scientists (1986), Becker offers advice to individuals interested in social science writing. According to Becker, the book is composed of information he learned from students while teaching a seminar at Northwestern University on sociological writing style. In an interview, Becker states "bad sociological writing cannot be separated from the theoretical problems of the discipline." Thus, Becker advises scholars to write in a direct style, avoiding the passive voice and abstract nouns.

In Tricks of the Trade, Becker outlines his ideas on sociological methods. The book focuses on Becker's belief that it is impossible to establish a method of research independent of the situation it is being used in. According to Becker, the principles of social research he describes in the book are based primarily on what he learned from his professors and colleagues at the University of Chicago. Furthermore, Becker promotes systematic data collection and rigorous analysis as a way to make sense of social world.

In Telling About Society, considered the third installment in Becker's series of writing guides, Becker argues that socially produced texts, or artifacts can be valuable sources of information about the society which has produced them. As in earlier works, he stresses the importance of studying the activities and processes which have created these artifacts, as opposed to just studying the objects themselves.

== Bibliography ==
=== Books ===
- Boys in White: Student Culture in Medical School with Blanche Geer, Everett C. Hughes and Anselm Strauss (Chicago: University of Chicago Press, 1961). ISBN 978-0-87855-622-9
- The Other Side: Perspectives on Deviance. ed. Becker, Howard S. (New York:The Free Press, 1964). ISBN 0-02-902210-X
- Making the Grade: The Academic Side of College Life with Blanche Geer and Everett C. Hughes (New York: Wiley, 1968). New edition (1995) with new introduction. ISBN 978-1-56000-807-1
- Sociological Work: Method and Substance. (Chicago: Adline, 1970) collected papers, including two previously unpublished: "On Methodology" and "Field Work Evidence." ISBN 978-0-87855-630-4
- Outsiders: Studies in the Sociology of Deviance. (New York: The Free Press, 1963). ISBN 978-0-684-83635-5
- Exploring Society Photographically. (Mary & Leigh Block Gallery, 1981). ISBN 978-0-941-68000-4
- Art Worlds. (Berkeley: University of California Press, 1982). ISBN 978-0-520-25636-1
- Writing for Social Scientists. (Chicago: University of Chicago Press, 1986, Second Edition, 2007). ISBN 978-0-226-04132-2
- Doing Things Together: Selected Papers, (Evanston: Northwestern University Press, 1986). ISBN 978-0-8101-0723-6
- Tricks of the Trade: How to Think about Your Research While You're Doing It (Chicago: University of Chicago Press, 1998). ISBN 978-0-226-04124-7 Excerpt
- Telling About Society. (Chicago: University of Chicago Press, 2007). ISBN 978-0-226-04126-1
- Do You Know . . . ? The Jazz Repertoire in Action (Chicago: University of Chicago Press, 2009), with Robert R. Faulkner. ISBN 978-0-226-23921-7 Excerpt.
- Thinking Together: An E-mail Exchange and All That Jazz (Los Angeles: USC Annenberg Press, 2013), with Robert R. Faulkner. ISBN 978-1-62517203-7
- What About Mozart? What About Murder? (Chicago: University of Chicago Press, 2015). ISBN 978-0-226-16635-3
- Evidence (Chicago: University of Chicago Press, 2017). ISBN 978-0-226-46637-8
- Qu'est-ce qu'un cas? Explorer les fondements de l'enquête en sciences sociales (Basel: Schwabe, 2021), with Charles C. Ragin. ISBN 978-3-7965-4173-5

=== Articles ===
1951–1994

- "The Professional Dance Musician and his Audience," American Journal of Sociology 57:2 (September 1951), pp. 136–144
- "Modest Proposals for Graduate Programs in Sociology," with Bernard Beck, pp. 227–34 in American Sociologist:4 (August 1969).
- "Social Science in the Work of Hans Haacke" with John Walton, pp. 145–52 in Hans Haacke, Framing and Being Framed, New York: New York University, 1976.
- "Fieldwork with the Computer: Criteria for Assessing Systems," with Andrew Gordon and Robert LeBailly, pp. 16–33 in Qualitative Sociology, 7 (Spring–Summer, 1984).
- "Confusion of Values," originally published in French as "La Confusion de Valeurs," pp. 11–28 in Pierre-Michel Menger and Jean-Claude Passeron, eds., L'art de la recherche: Melanges, Paris: La Documentation Française, 1994.
- "Professionalism in Sociology: The Case of C. Wright Mills," pp. 175–87 in Ray Rist, editor, The Democratic Imagination: Dialogues on the Work of Irving Louis Horowitz, New Brunswick: Transaction Books, 1994.
- "American Popular Song," pp. 9–18 in Ton Bevers, ed., Artists—Dealers—Consumers: On the Social World of Art, Hilversum: Verloren, 1994.
- "Children's Conceptions of Money: Concepts and Social Organization," in Social Organization and Social Process, David Maines, ed., Aldine Publishing Co., 1991, pp. 45–57.
- "Consciousness, Power and Drug Effects," Society, 10 (May 1973) pp. 26–31. A longer version appears in The Journal of Psychedelic Drugs, 6 (January–March 1974) pp. 67–76

1995–2004

- "Visual Evidence: A Seventh Man, the Specified Generalization, and the Work of the Reader" Visual Studies, (2002) 17, pp. 3–11.
- "Studying the New Media," Qualitative Sociology 25 (3), 2002, pp. 337–43
- "Drugs: What Are They?" (Published in French as "Les drogues: que sont-elles?," pp. 11–20 in Howard S. Becker, ed., Qu'est-ce qu'une drogue?, Anglet: Atlantica, 2001)
- "The Etiquette of Improvisation ," Mind, Culture, and Activity, 7 (2000), pp. 171–76 and 197–200.
- "The Chicago School, So-Called," Qualitative Sociology, 22 (1), 1999, pp. 3–12.
- "Talks Between Teachers," (with Shirah Hecht), Qualitative Sociology, 20 (1997), pp. 565–79.
- "Hypertext Fiction," pp. 67–81 in M. Lourdes Lima dos Santos, Cultura & Economia, Lisbon: Edicões do Instituto de Ciências Sociais, 1995.
- "The Power of Inertia," Qualitative Sociology 18 (1995), pp. 301–309.

2004–2007

- "ASA Convention," Social Psychology Quarterly, (2007) 4, pp. cover, 1–2.
- "How we deal with the people we study: 'The Last Seminar' revisited," pp. 26–36 in David Downes, et al. eds., Crime, Social Control and Human Rights, Cullompton: Willan Publishing, 2007
- "The Jazz Repertoire." Enonciation artistique et socialité. Edited by Jean-Philippe Uzel (Harmattan: Paris 2006), pp. 243–51.
- "The Lay Referral System: The Problem of Professional Power," Knowledge, Work and Society, (2006) 4, pp. 65–76.
- "A Dialogue on the Ideas of 'World' and 'Field' with Alain Pessin," Sociological Forum, 21 (2006), pp. 275–86.
- "The Jazz Repertoire," with Robert R. Faulkner, Sociologie de l'art (2005), pp. 15–24.
- "Inventer chemin faisant: comment j'ai écrit Les mondes de l'art" ("Making it up as you go along: How I Wrote Art Worlds,") pp. 57–73 in Daniel Mercure, ed., L'analyse du social: Les modes d'explication, Quebec: Les Presses de l'Université Laval, 2005.
- "Jazz Places," pp. 17–27 in Andy Bennett and Richard A. Peterson, eds., Music Scenes: Local, Translocal, and Virtual, Nashville: Vanderbilt University Press, 2004; and in French in Sociologie et Societé, 2004.

2008–present

- "Learning to Observe in Chicago", in Jean Peneff, Le goût de l'observation (Paris: La Découverte, 2009), pp. 60–61, 76–77 and 126-27 (en français).
- "Twenty Three Thoughts About Youth". La marque jeune, edited by Marc-Olivier Gonseth, Yann Laville and Grégoire Mayor (Neuchâtel: Musée d'ethnographieNeuchâtel).
- "Studying Something You Are Part of: The View From the Bandstand", Ethnologie Française, XXXVIII (2008), pp. 15–21.
- "In San Francisco, when my neighborhood experiences pandemics", Socioscapes. International Journal of Societies, Politics and Cultures, (2022), 2(1), 176–179.

Awards
Preceded by James Coleman	Common Wealth Award of Distinguished Service in Sociology; 1981; With: Peter Blau	Succeeded by Charles Tilly
Preceded by Otis Dudley Duncan	Common Wealth Award of Distinguished Service in Sociology; 1981; With: Peter Blau	Succeeded by Charles Tilly
Preceded by William H. Sewell	W.E.B. Du Bois Career of Distinguished Scholarship Award; 1998	Succeeded by Dorothy E. Smith
