= Significant symbols =

Concept in sociology

In sociology, a significant symbol is a gesture (usually a vocal gesture) that calls out in the individual making the gesture the same (i.e., functionally identical) response that is called out in others to whom the gesture is directed. Significant symbols are a later by-product of the meaning emergent in the act, which meaning is described, or accounted for, in terms of symbols or language.

== Origin ==
Significant symbols originated by the social behaviorist George Herbert Mead, who made a great impact in sociologist studies in the 20th century. Mead was interested specifically in the work of Wilhelm Wundt. It was from Wundt that Mead gained an understanding how the gesture is involved in social interaction. This sociological term significant symbols is the basis for symbolic interactionism, which attempts to define the self.

== Language ==
Language, in Mead's view, is communication through significant symbols. Physical objects can be significant symbols, but vocal gestures, especially language, are the crucial significant symbols. Language brings out the same response in both the speaker and hearer. Language is the highest form of communication, a mature development of the gesture situation; therefore, the major tool of the interaction from which minds and selves emerge. Language is important because it is the means by which an individual may convey his attitudes and assume the roles of others, and thus participate in the interactionary creation of mind and self. Language also makes possible the critically important ability of people to think, to engage in mental processes. Thinking, as well as the mind, is simply defined as conversation that people have with themselves using language; this activity is like having a conversation with other people. Language allows people to stimulate their own actions as well as those of others.

== Role-taking and coordinated behavior ==
Through role-taking and the development of significant gestures and symbols the mind develops as the ability to indicate to one's self the same response that one's gestures had brought out in others, and to control the response in terms of it.

Accuracy in role-taking also implies a preexisting social world of shared linguistic meanings that enable actors to respond to their own oncoming behavior in the same way as the other. Without them, role-taking and coordinated behavior could not proceed.

Significant symbols' specific meaning differs in various social situations.

== Communication ==
Significant communication may also be defined as the comprehension by the individual through the meaning of her gestures. Mead describes the communication process as a social act since it necessarily requires at least two individuals in interaction with one another. It is within this act that meaning arises. The act of communication has a triadic structure consisting of the following components:

- An initiating gesture on the part of an individual
- A response to that gesture by a second individual
- The result of the action initiated by the first gesture

In and during the social contact, the mind recognizes symbols and translates those symbols, and acts or adjusts to symbols based on the previous knowledge of meaning.

== Significance of gestures ==
A gesture, then, is an action that implies a reaction. The reaction is the meaning of the gesture and points toward the result (the "intentionality") of the action initiated by the gesture. Gestures "become significant symbols when they absolutely arouse in an individual making them the same responses which they explicitly arouse, or are [intended] to arouse, in other individuals, the individuals to whom they are addressed."

Although people and animals employ insignificant gestures, only people employ significant gestures, or those that involve thought before a response is made.

Significant symbols always imply a context within which it has significance, a universe of discourse. The universe of discourse is constituted by a group of individuals carrying on a common social process, within which these symbols have common meaning within that group, regardless of whether the members are making the gestures or responding to them.

== Examples ==
- If you bark at a dog, the dog will bark back. If you bark at a human, the human may or may not bark back. It all depends on the human's decision to the symbol
- If an organism were to scratch their tooth repeatedly, only those involved within that social situation might be able to interpret that gesture and subsequently be able to respond. This is the essence of the significant symbol. It has meaning. One can respond to it.
- If an individual was to say the word dog to another person, both persons would have a similar mental image of a dog.
- If an individual yelled the word fire in a crowded theater, everyone would be driven to escape the theater as quickly as possible.
