= Journal of Experimental Social Psychology =

- Discipline: Social psychology
- Language: English
- Edited by: Nicolas Rule

Publication details
- History: 1965–present
- Publisher: Elsevier
- Frequency: Bimonthly
- Impact factor: 3.532 (2021)

Standard abbreviations
- ISO 4: J. Exp. Soc. Psychol.

Indexing
- CODEN: JESPAQ
- ISSN: 0022-1031
- OCLC no.: 01754583

Links
- Journal homepage; Online access

The Journal of Experimental Social Psychology is a peer-reviewed academic journal covering social psychology. It is published by Elsevier on behalf of the Society of Experimental Social Psychology (SESP). According to the Journal Citation Reports, the journal has a 2021 impact factor of 3.532.

The journal publishes original empirical papers on subjects including social cognition, attitudes, group behaviour, social influence, intergroup relations, self and identity, nonverbal communication, and social psychological aspects of affect and emotion.

Its current editor-in-chief is Nicholas Rule (University of Toronto).
