= Negotiated order =

Sociology concept

Negotiated order is an approach in sociology that is interested in how meaning is created and maintained in organizations. It has a particular focus on human interactions.

== See also ==
- Anselm Strauss
- George Herbert Mead
- Erving Goffman

== Sources ==
- Maines, David R., & Joy Charlton. (1985). Negotiated Order Approach to the Analysis of Social Organization. Studies in Symbolic Interaction, Supplement 1, 271–308.
- Reed, Michael. (1991). The Sociology of Organizations: Themes, Perspectives, Prospects. Hempel Hempstead, 83–92.
- Regan, Thomas G. (1984). Some Limits to the hospital as Negotiated Order. Social Science and Medicine 18, 243–249.
- Strauss, Anselm. (1978). Negotiations: Varieties, Processes, Contexts, and Social Order. San Francisco, 105–141.
- Strauss, Anselm, et al. (1994). The Hospital and Its Negotiated Order. In Eliot Freidson (Ed.), The Hospital in Modern Society. New York, 147–169.
