= Joseph Berger (sociologist) =

American sociologist (1924–2023)

- Born: April 3, 1924; New York City, New York, U.S.
- Died: December 24, 2023 (aged 99)
- Spouse: Margeret Berger

Academic background
- Education: Brooklyn College; Harvard University

Academic work
- Discipline: Sociology
- Institutions: Stanford University
- Notable ideas: Expectation states theory

Joseph Berger (April 3, 1924 – December 24, 2023) was an American sociologist and social psychologist best known for co-founding expectation states theory. Expectation states theory explains how individuals use social information about one another (such as race, gender, or specific skills) to create informal status hierarchies in small groups. Researchers have used this program to develop interventions that counteract the disadvantages faced most notably by black students in the classroom and women leaders in the workplace. Social scientists have also applied this work to study hiring bias against mothers and discrimination against loan applicants among other topics.

Berger used expectation states theory as an exemplar of formal (or axiomatic) theory construction, for whose wider adoption among sociologists he advocated. Formal theories are logically related sets of statements from which a scientist can logically deduce hypotheses (e.g., if A → B and B → C, then A → C). Formal theorists then lay out the precise conditions under which their predictions do and do not apply. This contrasts with the norm in sociological theorizing, which is less explicit in its definitions, predictions, and scope.

Berger was later a professor emeritus at Stanford University and a senior fellow at the Hoover Institution.

== Biography ==
A native of Brooklyn, he was educated at Thomas Jefferson High School and Brooklyn College. After earning his doctoral degree in sociology at Harvard University in the 1950s, where he had been taught by Talcott Parsons, he established a theoretical and experimental research program at Stanford. The program, expectation states theory, has many branches and through his mentorship of generations of graduate students, this program has been a unique example of the growth of knowledge in sociology through chains of theory development accompanied by experimental tests and refinements.

His expertise was in the area of status processes and status relations among members of different groups, processes of legitimation, reward expectations and distributive justice, and theory construction in the behavioral sciences. His later research focused on gender relations in interpersonal settings, status characteristics theory, and cumulative theory in social science.

Berger, along with collaborators, edited a large number of books to which invited scholars have contributed papers that elaborate upon one or another "sociological theory in progress."

Berger was a recipient of the Cooley-Mead Award from the American Sociological Association to honor long-term distinguished contributions to the intellectual and scientific advancement of social psychology. In 2007, he received the W. E. B. Du Bois Award for his contributions to the field of sociology.

Berger died on December 24, 2023, at the age of 99. His death was announced in April 2024.

== Bibliography ==
Books

- Types of Formalization in Small Group Research, 1962, by Joseph Berger, Bernard P. Cohen, J. Laurie Snell, and Morris Zelditch Jr.
- Status Characteristics and Social Interaction: An Expectation States Approach, 1977, by Joseph Berger, M. Hamit Fisek, Robert Z. Norman, and Morris Zelditch Jr.

Edited Volumes

- Sociological Theories in Progress, Vol. I, 1966, edited by Joseph Berger, Morris Zelditch Jr., and Bo Anderson
- Sociological Theories in Progress, Vol. II, 1972, edited by Joseph Berger, Morris Zelditch Jr., and Bo Anderson
- Expectation States Theory: A Theoretical Research Program, 1974, edited by Joseph Berger, Thomas L. Conner, and M. Hamit Fisek
- Status, Rewards, and Influence: How Expectations Organize Behavior, 1985, edited by Joseph Berger and Morris Zelditch Jr.
- Sociological Theories in Progress, New Formulations, 1989, edited by Joseph Berger, Morris Zelditch Jr., and Bo Anderson
- Theoretical Research Programs: Studies in the Growth of Theory, 1993, edited by Joseph Berger and Morris Zelditch Jr.
- Status, Power, and Legitimacy: Strategies and Theories, 1998, edited by Joseph Berger and Morris Zelditch Jr.
- New Directions in Contemporary Sociological Theory, 2002, edited by Joseph Berger and Morris Zelditch Jr.
