= Ralph H. Turner =

American sociologist

- Born: December 15, 1919; Effingham, Illinois, U.S.
- Died: April 5, 2014 (aged 94); Los Angeles, California, U.S.
- Education: Pasadena City College; University of Southern California; University of Wisconsin; University of Chicago
- Partner: Christine née Hanks
- Children: 2
- Scientific career
- Institutions: United States Navy; University of California, Los Angeles

Ralph Herbert Turner (December 15, 1919–April 5, 2014) was an American sociologist who researched collective behavior and social movements. He served as president of the American Sociological Association and editor of Sociometry and the Annual Review of Sociology. He was the recipient of both a Fulbright grant and a Guggenheim Fellowship.

== Early life and education ==
Ralph Herbert Turner was born on December 15, 1919, in Effingham, Illinois, to parents Herbert and Hilda née Bohn. His parents had emigrated from England two months before he was born. His family moved to Pasadena when he was young; he often hiked and camped in the San Gabriel Mountains, becoming an Eagle Scout establishing a life-long love of nature. He first attended Pasadena City College, a community college, before transferring to the University of Southern California to complete his bachelor's degree. He stayed at USC to complete a master's degree. He briefly studied at University of Wisconsin before serving World War II, though finished his PhD at the University of Chicago in 1948.

== Career ==
During World War II, Turner served in the United States Navy. He served as a disbursing officer on the USS Lexington, an aircraft carrier, in the Pacific theater. He accepted a position as lecturer at University of California, Los Angeles in 1948 in their joint department for sociology and anthropology. When the joint department split, Turner became the first chair of the sociology department in 1963, remaining chair through 1968. He retired in 1990, having spent forty-two years at UCLA.

He was editor of the journal Sociometry (now Social Psychology Quarterly) from 1962 to 1964. He served as acting editor of the Annual Review of Sociology in 1978, then as editor from 1981 to 1986. Throughout his career he authored over 120 articles and reviews, as well as eight books. He co-authored three editions of Collective Behavior with Lewis Killian in 1957, 1972, and 1987; The Social Context of Ambition in 1964; Robert Park: On Social Control and Collective Behavior in 1967; Family Interaction in 1970; and Social Psychology: Sociological Perspectives in 1981. Altogether, about half of his scholarly publications involved collective behavior and social movements.

== Awards and honors ==
Turner received a Fulbright grant in 1956 to conduct sociological research in England for a year. He was awarded a Guggenheim Fellowship in 1964 for his work in sociology. Turner was the president of the American Sociological Association in 1968 and 1969. He received the UCLA Emeritus of the Year award in 1997 and the Panunzio Distinguished Emeriti Award in 2002.

== Personal life and death ==
At the University of Southern California, he met Christine Hanks, who was also a sociology major. He and Christine married in 1943 and remained married until her death in 2001. They had a son and daughter together. Turner's hobbies included hiking and wildlife photography. He died on April 5, 2014, in Los Angeles at the age of 94.
