= Aldon Morris =

American sociologist (born 1949)

Aldon D. Morris
- Born: June 15, 1949 (age 77); Tutwiler, Mississippi, U.S.
- Occupation: Professor

Academic background
- Education: Southeast Community College, Chicago Bradley University State University of New York, Stony Brook (Ph.D., 1980)
- Doctoral advisor: Lewis A. Coser
- Other advisor: Charles Perrow
- Influences: W.E.B. Du Bois

Academic work
- Discipline: Sociologist
- Sub-discipline: Civil rights
- Institutions: University of Michigan Northwestern University
- Notable works: The Origins of the Civil Rights Movement The Scholar Denied

Aldon Douglas Morris (born June 15, 1949) is emeritus professor of sociology at Northwestern University and member of the American Academy of Arts and Sciences, whose work involves social movements, civil rights, and social inequality. He was the 2021 president of the American Sociological Association. He is best known for his work on sociologist W. E. B. Du Bois.

== Early life and education ==
Morris, an African-American and the grandson of sharecroppers, was born in rural Tutwiler, Mississippi. As a child he experienced Jim Crow racism and segregation; one of his earliest memories was the lynching of 14-year-old Emmett Till. He moved to Chicago with his family, and enrolled at Southeast Community College in 1968. Morris studied sociology and social movements at Bradley University and the State University of New York, Stony Brook, receiving his PhD in 1980.

== Career ==
Morris was an associate professor of sociology at the University of Michigan from 1980 to 1990. He joined the faculty of Northwestern University in 1988, where he was the Leon Forrest professor of sociology and African-American Studies. Previously at Northwestern, he chaired the sociology department, directed Asian American Studies, served as associate dean for faculty affairs, and served as interim dean for the Weinberg College of Arts and Sciences.

Morris was inspired by the moving oration of Martin Luther King Jr. and the scholarship of sociologist W.E.B. Du Bois, the first black man to earn a doctorate from Harvard University. In 2005, Morris and a group of peers persuaded the American Sociological Association to rename their top award after Du Bois. In his 2015 book, The Scholar Denied: W. E. B. Du Bois and the Birth of Modern Sociology, Morris argued that Du Bois was the founder of modern American sociology, and that his contributions to the field were suppressed for decades due to institutional racism.

In 2019, Morris was elected as president-elect of the American Sociological Association, and served as the 112th president of the association in 2021.

== Selected publications ==
=== Books ===
- Morris, Aldon D. (1984). The Origins of the Civil Rights Movement: Black Communities Organizing for Change. Free Press. ISBN 9780029221303.
- Aldon D. Morris; Carol McClurg Mueller (1992). Frontiers in Social Movement Theory. Yale University Press. ISBN 9780300054866.
- Jane J. Mansbridge; Aldon Morris (October 30, 2001). Oppositional Consciousness: The Subjective Roots of Social Protest. University of Chicago Press. ISBN 9780226503622.
- Morris, Aldon D. (August 2015). The Scholar Denied: W. E. B. Du Bois and the Birth of Modern Sociology. University of California Press. ISBN 9780520276352.

=== Articles ===
- Morris, Aldon (December 1981). "Black Southern Student Sit-in Movement: An Analysis of Internal Organization". American Sociological Review. 46 (6): 755–767. doi:10.2307/2095077. JSTOR 2095077.
- Morris, Aldon D. (October 1993). "Birmingham Confrontation Reconsidered: An Analysis of the Dynamics and Tactics of Mobilization". American Sociological Review. 58 (5): 621–636. doi:10.2307/2096278. JSTOR 2096278.
- Morris, Aldon (May 2000). "Reflections on Social Movement Theory: Criticisms and Proposals". Contemporary Sociology. 29 (3): 445–454. doi:10.2307/2653931. JSTOR 2653931.

== Awards ==
- 1986: Distinguished Contribution to Scholarship Award, American Sociological Association
- 1988: Outstanding Leadership Award, Association of Black Sociologists (Morris served as president from 1986 to 1988)
- 2006: Joseph Himes award for Lifetime Achievement for a Career of Distinguished Scholarship, Association of Black Sociologists
- 2009: Cox-Johnson-Frazier award, American Sociological Association
- 2013: A. Wade Smith Award for Teaching, Mentoring and Service, Association of Black Sociologists
- 2016: R.R. Hawkins Award and Award for Excellence in Social Sciences, PROSE Awards
- 2020: W.E.B. Du Bois Career of Distinguished Scholarship Award
