= David A. Snow =

American sociologist

- Born: Saginaw, Michigan, U.S.
- Known for: Research on social movements, framing processes, homelessness, and poverty
- Awards: W.E.B. Du Bois Career of Distinguished Scholarship Award (2025); Elected to the American Academy of Arts and Sciences (2026)

Academic background
- Education: Ohio University (BA); University of Akron (MA); University of California, Los Angeles (MA, PhD)

Academic work
- Discipline: Sociology
- Sub-discipline: Social movements, collective behavior, social psychology, and qualitative research
- Institutions: University of California, Irvine; University of Arizona; University of Texas at Austin; Southern Methodist University; Occidental College
- Notable works: Down on Their Luck; A Primer on Social Movements; The Wiley-Blackwell Companion to Social Movements

David A. Snow is an American sociologist and Distinguished Professor Emeritus of Sociology at the University of California, Irvine. His research has addressed collective behavior, social movements, homelessness and poverty, social psychology, culture, religion, and qualitative methodology. In 2025, he received the American Sociological Association's W.E.B. Du Bois Career of Distinguished Scholarship Award and was elected a member of the American Academy of Arts and Sciences in 2026.

== Early life and education ==
Born in Saginaw, Michigan, Snow grew up in Ohio and received a Bachelor of Arts degree in sociology from Ohio University in 1966. After serving for two years in the U.S. Army and working for a year as a juvenile parole officer, he received a Master of Arts degree in urban studies from the University of Akron in 1971. He subsequently received a Master of Arts degree in sociology from the University of California, Los Angeles in 1972 and a Ph.D. in sociology from UCLA in 1976.

== Career ==
Snow taught at Southern Methodist University in 1975-76, the University of Texas at Austin from 1976-1987, and the University of Arizona, where he was professor of sociology from 1987 to 2001, including nine years as head of its Department of Sociology.

Snow joined the University of California, Irvine in 2001. He was appointed Chancellor's Professor in 2006 and Distinguished Professor of Sociology in 2011, before retiring as Distinguished Professor Emeritus in 2019.

At UCI, he served as co-director and later director of the Center for Citizen Peacebuilding. The center supported research and community-based activities intended to discourage conflict and violence, helped establish the Olive Tree Initiative, and supported the launching of a Youth and Gang Violence Intervention Training Program. Snow was also UCI's Faculty Athletic Representative from 2004 to 2019.

Snow has been president of the Society for the Study of Symbolic Interaction and the Pacific Sociological Association. He served as vice president of the American Sociological Association from 2010 to 2011.

== Research ==
Snow's research encompasses collective behavior and social movements; socioeconomic marginality with a focus on homelessness and poverty; social psychology and culture; religion and religious movements; and qualitative field methods. In his work on social movements, he is best known for his widely-cited development and elaboration of the framing perspective, which examines the interpretive and meaning-making work undertaken by movement participants and other relevant actors. The perspective treats the meanings associated with events, activities, places, and actors as contestable and open to interpretation and negotiation, rather than as fixed or self-evident. Snow's work on framing contributed to its use as an analytical approach in studies of social movements and related areas of sociology.

Snow's research on social inequality has focused on the adaptive subculture and social psychology of extreme poverty and homelessness. In Down on Their Luck (University of California Press 1993), written with Leon Anderson, Snow examined the everyday experiences and survival strategies of homeless people through interviews, participant observation, and research on social-service agencies. The book received the Charles Horton Cooley Award from the Society for the Study of Symbolic Interaction, the Distinguished Scholarship Award from the Pacific Sociological Association, and the Scholarly Achievement Award from the North Central Sociological Association.

In 2017, Snow co-led a study of the costs of homelessness in Orange County, California, in collaboration with Orange County United Way and Jamboree Housing. His 2026 book, A Cancer Odyssey: Navigating Cancer, COVID, and a Clinical Trial During the Pandemic Years, is an autoethnographic account of his experiences with cancer, COVID-19, and a clinical trial during the COVID-19 pandemic.

== Honors and awards ==
Snow received the Society for the Study of Social Problems' Lee Founders Award for career contributions to the study of social problems in 2008. In 2011, he was named Distinguished Professor of Sociology at UCI. In 2012, the UCI Alumni Association granted Snow the Lauds & Laurels Faculty Achievement Award.

In 2013, Snow received the John D. McCarthy Award for Lifetime Achievement in the Scholarship of Social Movements and Collective Behavior from the University of Notre Dame's Center for the Study of Social Movements. He received the George Herbert Mead Lifetime Achievement Award from the Society for the Study of Symbolic Interaction in 2016 and the Aldon Morris Award for Lifetime Achievement in the Scholarship of Social Movements from the American Sociological Association's Collective Behavior and Social Movements Section in 2024.

In 2025, the American Sociological Association gave Snow the W.E.B. Du Bois Career of Distinguished Scholarship Award, one of the association's highest honors. In 2026, he was elected to the American Academy of Arts and Sciences.

== Selected books ==
- Snow, David A. (1993). Shakubuku: A Study of the Nichiren Shoshu Buddhist Movement in America, 1960 to 1975. Garland Publishing.
- Snow, David A., and Leon Anderson (1993). Down on Their Luck: A Study of Homeless Street People. University of California Press.
- Lofland, John; Snow, David A.; Anderson, Leon; and Lofland, Lyn H. (2006). Analyzing Social Settings: A Guide to Qualitative Observation and Analysis (4th ed.). Waveland Press, Inc.
- Snow, David A., and Sarah A. Soule (2010). A Primer on Social Movements. W. W. Norton & Company.
- Snow, David A.; Soule, Sarah A.; Kriesi, Hanspeter; and McCammon, Holly J. (eds.) (2019). The Wiley Blackwell Companion to Social Movements (2nd ed.). Wiley-Blackwell.
- Snow, David A.; della Porta, Donatella; McAdam, Doug; and Klandermans, Bert (eds.) (2023). The Wiley-Blackwell Encyclopedia of Social and Political Movements (2nd ed., 5 volumes). Wiley-Blackwell.
- Snow, David A.; McAdam, Doug; and Moss, Dana M. (eds.) (2026). Contemporary Social Movements: Descriptive and Historical Accounts. Wiley-Blackwell.
- Snow, David A. (2026). A Cancer Odyssey: Navigating Cancer, COVID, and a Clinical Trial During the Pandemic Years. Greenleaf Book Group/River Grove Books.

== Selected publications ==
- Snow, David A., Louis A. Zurcher, and Sheldon Ekland-Olson (1980). "Social Networks and Social Movements: A Microstructural Approach to Differential Recruitment." American Sociological Review 45: 787–801.
- Snow, David A., and Richard Machalek (1984). "The Sociology of Conversion." Annual Review of Sociology 10: 167-190.
- Snow, David A., E. Burke Rochford Jr., Steven K. Worden, and Robert D. Benford (1986). "Frame Alignment Processes, Micromobilization, and Movement Participation." American Sociological Review 51: 464–481.
- Snow, David A., and Leon Anderson (1987). "Identity Work Among the Homeless: The Verbal Construction and Avowal of Personal Identities." American Journal of Sociology 92 (6): 1336–1371.
- Snow, David A., and Robert D. Benford (1988). "Ideology, Frame Resonance, and Participant Mobilization." International Social Movement Research 1: 197-217.
- Snow, David A., and Robert D. Benford (1992). "Master Frames and Cycles of Protest." In Aldon D. Morris and Carol McClurg Mueller (eds.), Frontiers in Social Movement Theory. Yale University Press, pp. 133–155.
- Benford, Robert D., and David A. Snow (2000). "Framing Processes and Social Movements: An Overview and Assessment." Annual Review of Sociology 26: 611–639.
- Snow, David A. (2004). "Framing Processes, Ideology, and Discursive Fields." In David A. Snow, Sarah A. Soule, and Hanspeter Kriesi (eds.), The Blackwell Companion to Social Movements. Blackwell Publishing, pp. 380–412.
- Snow, David A., and Dana M. Moss (2014). "Protest on the Fly: Toward a Theory of Spontaneity in the Dynamics of Protest and Social Movements." American Sociological Review 79: 1122–1143.
- Snow, David A., Rens Vliegenthart, and Peter Ketelaars (2019). "The Framing Perspective on Social Movements: Its Conceptual Roots and Architecture." In David A. Snow, Sarah A. Soule, Hanspeter Kriesi, and Holly J. McCammon (eds.), The Wiley-Blackwell Companion to Social Movements (2nd ed.). Wiley Blackwell, pp. 392–410.
