= Expectation states theory =

Social psychological theory

Expectation states theory is a social psychological theory first proposed by Joseph Berger and his colleagues that explains how expected competence forms the basis for status hierarchies in small groups. The theory's best known branch, status characteristics theory, deals with the role that certain pieces of social information (e.g., race, gender, and specific abilities) play in organizing these hierarchies. More recently, sociologist Cecilia Ridgeway has utilized the theory to explain how beliefs about status become attached to different social groups and the implications this has for social inequality.

== Basic concepts ==
=== Scope ===
The theory attempts to explain: "When a task-oriented group is differentiated with respect to some external status characteristic, this status difference determines the observable power and prestige within the group whether or not the external status characteristic is related to the group task". In other words, the theory attempts to explain how hierarchies are created in small group interactions (with a shared goal) based on status cues. Specifically, this theory explains unequal distribution of participation, influence, and prestige between members of the group. This theory has implications for macro- and population-level hierarchy and inequality between groups.

In general, expectation states theory is meant to explain the way that interpersonal status hierarchies work. "Interpersonal status hierarchies" refers to the emergence of differential levels of social esteem and influence that occurs when groups of people interact. Research has found that several factors may influence the ways that status hierarchies emerge; however, the driving force seems to be implicit assumptions that group members hold about each other members' level of ability for completing the task at hand. Expectation states theory originated in the sociology literature and started with observations about differences in participation, influence, and prestige across members small groups, and these differences varied as a function of status characteristics.

The primary goal of expectation state theory as applied to gender is to explain how observed differences between social groups become the basis for inequality in everyday social encounters. While expectation states theory describes the development of status beliefs broadly, and can be applied to the study of any social groups, it is most commonly used to examine and explain inequality as it relates to gender.

=== Forebears ===
In general, expectation states theory is meant to explain the way that interpersonal status hierarchies work (Berger et al., 1972). "Interpersonal status hierarchies" refers to the emergence of differential levels of social esteem and influence that occurs when groups of people interact. Research has found that several factors may influence the ways that status hierarchies emerge; however, the driving force seems to be implicit assumptions that group members hold about each other members' level of ability for completing the task at hand. Expectation states theory originated in the sociology literature and started with observations about differences in participation, influence, and prestige across members small groups, and these differences varied as a function of status characteristics.

Ridgeway (2011) also draws on status construction theory which states that as various groups (e.g. men and women) interact with each other over time, status hierarchies will often cause one group to be seen as more competent than the other. If this effect is repeated over time, the group with the higher status hierarchy will become more influential and the group with the lower status hierarchy will be more likely to give in to what the higher status group wants.

There are two types of status characteristics in status characteristics theory. (1) Diffuse status characteristics operates in a culture if (a) one state (i.e., male) is valued more than the other, and (b) that state is expected to be more competent at specific tasks, and (c) they are expected to generally be more competent at a wide variety of tasks. (2) Specific status characteristics do not have the third requirement (i.e., men are generally better than women at wide range of tasks; Berger et al., 1977).

Aspects of expectation state theory also draw on reward expectations theory which focuses on how status characteristics, abilities, and task accomplishment are related to expectations for rewards (Berger, Fiske, Norman, & Wagner, 1985). Reward expectations theory suggests that individuals who receive greater rewards are expected to be more competent than group members who do not receive high level of rewards.

=== Basic assumptions ===
Berger et al., (1972) identify the following assumptions:

Assumption 1. (Activation) Given a situation, if a diffuse status characteristic in a task situation is a social basis of discrimination between p' (persons) and o (other) then the diffuse status characteristic is activated in the task situation.

Assumption 2. (Burden of proof) If diffuse status characteristic is activated in the task situation and has not been previously dissociated from a characteristic predictive of success, and if there is no other social basis of discrimination between p' and o, then at least one consistent component of diffuse status characteristic will become relevant to characteristic predictive of success in task situation.

Assumption 3. (Assignment) If any components of an activated diffuse status characteristic are relevant to characteristic predictive of success, p will assign states of characteristic predictive of success to self and other in a consistent manner.

Assumption 4. (Basic Expectation Assumption) If p assigns states of characteristic predictive of success to himself/herself and o consistent with the states of an activated diffuse status characteristic, then p's position relative to o in the observable power and prestige order will be a direct function of p's expectation advantage over o.

In addition to the assumptions identified by Berger et al. (1972), there are implicit assumptions inherent in expectation state theory. First, that men and women see their gender differences as salient. This is something that could differ based on the task that the group is working on (or what their common goal is), their cultural norms (are they more liberal or more conservative) may be more relevant than if they were working on a less gendered task (e.g., a, and even how strongly members themselves identify with their gender norms. If men and women are working on a highly gendered task (for example, a marketing team working on an advertising campaign for lipstick), expectation states then advertising campaign for flu vaccinations). Similarly, expectation states theory may be less relevant when referring to a group of individuals who do not conform to gender norms versus those that do.

Expectation states theory makes a number of unique assumptions in accounting for gender inequality. First, barriers to women's advancement to upper-level positions of authority are due to gender's status element, rather than something inherent to gender itself. Inequality is thus due to basic evaluative assumptions about women's competence as opposed to that of men. Therefore, the predictions expectation states theory makes about inequality are the same for any two groups about which evaluative assumptions can be made about one group as compared to the other. The theory can therefore account for not only gender inequality, but also racial and other types of inequality.

A second and related assumption is that all status assumptions resulting in inequality associate the advantaged group with higher levels of skill or resources (Webster & Foshci, 1988). In other words, status beliefs imply not only group differences but also group inequality. With regards to gender, status beliefs hold men to have higher levels of instrumental competence (Eagly & Mladinic, 1994).

Third, expectation states theory makes no assumptions regarding gender differences in individual ability to lead or achieve high levels of success. Thus, expectation states theory grounds hierarchical inequality in the sex categories themselves rather than individual strength, competence, or lactation status.

Finally, expectation states theory assumes that gender status beliefs affect performance expectations (and therefore result in inequality) only when gender is salient to the situation/task at hand. Thus, gender inequality will typically not surface except in mixed-sex groups, particularly if they are working on a task that is relevant to stereotypical gendered competence.

=== Related theories ===
The predictions made by expectation states theory are in many ways similar to those made by Eagly's Social-Role Theory. The key distinguishing feature of expectation states theory is that it is able not only to make predictions about the extent to which particular inequalities are due not only to gender but also to other status relevant differences.

A second related theory is Glick and Fiske's (1999) theory of stereotype content. These theories make similar predictions about how gender inequality is most likely to surface in contexts of cooperative interdependence and the "prescriptive element" of gender beliefs. However, the distinguishing feature here is that Expectation States Theory holds this prescriptive element to relate not only to gender but to any group distinction that may foster inequality.

=== Locations and contexts of application ===
Close relationships: Families and dyads In families or other close relationships, an individual's legitimate expertise would be recognized, which might help with implicit attributions based on gender. However, status hierarchy and expectation states theory may also influence close relationships, particularly if the situation is new or unusual. Status beliefs may also operate within the couple/family in public more than when they are in private since people may act in accordance with how they think others will perceive them. Overall, whether expectations state theory operates within close relationships might depend on how egalitarian the views of the individuals in the family are. For example, a highly egalitarian couple would relate to each other based on their legitimate experience. A less egalitarian couple may fall into "traditional" husband and wife roles because their status beliefs may serve as a crutch for how to act in their new and unfamiliar situation.

School, work, other legal/formalized social institutions This is what expectation state theory focuses on (gender and status hierarchies in the workplace). Expectation states is based on how group interactions are influenced by implicit status characteristics. If someone holds legitimate expertise, she may be able to overcome the negative attributions associated with her gender, but this may not always be the case.

Culture broadly defined, including popular culture, media Expectation states theory emerges based on cultural stereotypes and status beliefs. Therefore, it is more that culture influences expectation states/status hierarchy and not the other way around. Although, there is that self-fulfilling prophecy aspect of expectation states, so perhaps it is cyclical in the lens of culture as a whole as well.

== Formation of status beliefs ==
At the heart of expectation states theory is the concept of status beliefs. Status beliefs are defined as "widely held cultural beliefs that link greater social significance and general competence, as well as specific positive and negative skills, with one category of a social distinction compared to another".

Status beliefs arise from repeated interactions among members of different social groups, in which members of one group are observed to have some sort of structural advantage over members of another group. That is, they are perceived to have advantages in influencing members of other groups, due to possessing greater resources (such as money or prestige). If such perceived differences are observed across multiple interactions, in multiple contexts, they may become ingrained as a status belief. In such cases, individuals take them to heart and continue to spread such beliefs in future interactions.

Over time and repeated interactions, such beliefs can give rise to a hierarchy, in which individuals from groups with perceived greater status are granted power, authority, and influence over groups perceived to have lower status. The construction and enacting of status beliefs typically appears consensual, in that both the perceived higher and lower status groups take part in their formation and propagation.

== Gender ==
According to expectation states theory, gender status beliefs attribute greater competence and social status to men than women. Similar to Eagly's Social-Roles Theory, expectation states theory holds that gender stereotypes are prescriptive in nature, meaning the stereotype regards not only the way things are but the way they should be. Coupled with the theory's stance that status beliefs are consensual (shared by men and women), the prescriptive element leads women to act in ways that are commensurate with the status belief. In summary, status beliefs, which hold men to possess greater competence, have a prescriptive element. Due to the notion that status beliefs are widely held, they have great power in determining the behavior of both men and women in mixed gender settings.

Expectation states theory views individuals not only as a man/woman but as an aggregate whole of all identities which bestow them status in the eyes of others. The theory holds that while people are sex-categorized in almost every situation, they are also categorized according to other markers as well (e.g.,. race, education, or sexual orientation). A key tenet of the theory is that it not only includes traditional demographic differences as important contributors to status beliefs but also important aspects of an individual's identity such as education, title, and social role. Depending on which status characteristics are salient at a given time, gender and such other identities will combine to influence the ultimate performance expectations held by the individual and observers. In summary, an individual's behavioral and status differences are determined not only by his/her gender, but they are a function of the aggregate expectation of all identities relevant to a given task.

Facets of gender

Core gender identity (one's essential sense of self as female, male, other, none of the above) Expectations theory does not really address issues of core gender identity. However, it does explain how people come to believe that there are essential differences based in gender:

Beliefs about essential differences between genders are an important part of the theory because people draw on these beliefs (mostly unconsciously) in important ways. Within small groups that share a collective goal, group members need to decide who in the group will be most instrumental in achieving the goal (i.e., who is the most competent, has the most useful information or experience, etc.). These essential beliefs come into play when group members decide whom they should listen to (men) and who should listen and provide support (women). Even if members of the subordinate group do not personally endorse the status beliefs, they still assume that others will treat them according to these widely shared beliefs and therefore must take these beliefs into account in their own behavior. (Seachrist & Stangor, 2001)

Ridgeway et al. (1998) found that repeated encounters with people who consistently differed from them in pay, influence, and group distinction caused participants to form beliefs that influence-advantaged group members were more respected and competent than disadvantaged group members. Ridgeway and Erickson (2000) found that status beliefs spread when people were treated in ways consistent with the beliefs.

Sexuality, including sexual orientation Expectations states theory does not directly address this. To the extent that sexual orientation is a concealed identity (at least to others), sexual orientation may not be within the scope of expectations states theory.

There may be value in exploring the intersectionality between sexual orientation and gender in expectation states theory. However, since expectation states theory typically focuses on work groups this may be less applicable (people may be unlikely to share their sexual orientation with their coworkers) than other attributes such as race.

Gender stereotypes and other culturally-embedded representations of gender Drawing on social role theory (Eagly, 1987), and the stereotype content model (Fiske, Cuddy, Glick, & Xu, 2002), expectation state theory argues that, when deciding (unconsciously) who is most instrumental to achieving the goal, people rely on the content of stereotypes and status beliefs. Women are stereotypically communal and lower status than men. There has been empirical support for an implicit hierarchy gender stereotype. Mast (2004) found that the association between men and hierarchical and between woman and egalitarian was stronger than the associate between men and egalitarian and women and hierarchical. The implicit hierarchy gender stereotype is stronger for men than it is for women, which means men end up with more status and power than women.

These status beliefs are "widely held cultural beliefs that link greater social significance and general competences, as well as positive and negative skills, with one category of social distinction compared to another" (Ridgeway, 2001 p. 638). Because these are so ingrained in culture, individual accomplishments cannot overcome the disadvantages that come with being in a lower status group. Thomas-Hunt and Phillips (2004) found that female leaders who held expertise were less influential than male leaders, and that having expertise actually decreased how expert others perceived them to be. These differences were also reflected in group performance (groups with male experts outperformed those with female experts).

Diversity within and between groups, particularly intersections of social identity Expectation states theory does not address intersectional issues. However, because the theory argues that people draw on information based on their identities, intersectionality is relevant. For instance, how do people process identities that are dually marginalized (black women)? Are these women (based on cumulative status characteristics) going to be less influential than white women? In other words, do people process group members identities cumulatively/additively?

There have been studies that look at difference between different intersections. For example, Dugger (1998) found that African American women typically endorse more moderate forms of status beliefs than White women.

Biernat & Kobrynowicz (1997) looked at differences in minimum standards and ability standards in devalued groups and looked at male/female differences as well as black/white differences. However, they conducted two studies, each looking at a different grouping. This would have been a prime example of a study that may have benefited from an intersectionality framework.

Origins of gender

Nature vs. Nurture This theory does not deal with nature; it deals with "nurture." It emphasizes people's associations throughout the lifetime between group members and stereotype and status content. Even then, it does not deal with "nurture" in the sense of one's upbringing (by parents, relatives, etc.) but more in the sense of the culture that one grows up in.

How do we "get" gender? Expectation states theory does not touch on the development of gender identity. Again, it is more about how other perceive and responses to that perception. Takes for granted that gender develops and once someone has it, they bring it to/reproduce it through the situation or context that they are in. Gender is explained as an external, diffuse status characteristic that is used in groups to create expectations about an individual's performance capacity. The theory says we "get gender" by learning what to associate with ours and others' various stereotype and status cues.

"Ultimate explanations of gender" Expectation states theory does not touch on "ultimate explanations". The theory says that social role theory explains the ultimate origin, which is that physical differences, lead to the perception of psychological differences via observations of divisions of labor by sex.

== Support ==
=== Experimental tests ===
One characteristic of expectation states theory that sets it apart from many other psychology or sociological theories of inequality is that it has been tested empirically. In particular, recent experimental studies have tested and found support for the development of status beliefs relating to gender.

In particular, a study by Ridgeway and colleagues placed men and women into a fabricated decision-making scenario, in which members of one group were manipulated to have greater resources than another. Results showed that both men and women were more likely to listen to ascribe greater authority to individuals in the high status group, suggesting that both men and women take part in the formation and propagation of status beliefs. The researchers also found that, when women were in the high status group, they would perceive themselves to have legitimate authority, but would be less likely to act on it than would male participants. It was suggested that this hesitation may arise out of a perceived greater social consequence for women who wrongfully exert authority than for men. This has clear, practical implications for gender inequality. Similarly, in a second part of this study, the researchers found that women in both the perceived high and perceived low status groups were unlikely to resist a partner's influence, whereas males in the high status group were much more likely to displace resistance than males in the low status group.

=== Evidence for gender and leadership emergence ===
Much of the research evidence on Expectation States Theory regards women and leadership emergence. In order for such research to support Expectation States Theory, five pieces of evidence must be presented. First, men should show more signs of emerging as leaders in mixed groups working on a gender-neutral task. This would support the theory's claim that the higher performance expectations for men should lead them to act and be accepted accordingly. Second, these same results should be stronger in mixed-sex groups working on a masculine task because the status beliefs should be even more salient. Third, women should show slightly higher levels of emergence when the task is feminine in nature. This is because women are attributed higher competence in such situations. Fourth, in order to confirm Expectation States Theory's claim that status itself causes these differences rather than something inherent to gender, similar effects should be observed from other status characteristics such as race. Finally, differences in leadership emergence should be mediated by competence perceptions.

First, there is a good amount of evidence showing that men in mixed sex groups show more signs of leadership emergence. In a study of 24 mixed sex dyads performing a non-gendered task, men showed higher levels of power through verbal and nonverbal communication. Similarly, Wood and Karten observed that men engaged in more task-related behaviors such as opinion-giving while working in four-person mixed-sex groups. A recent meta-analysis found that men are more talkative than women in general but that the difference is even greater in mixed-sex groups. Finally, a meta-analysis by Eagly and Karau showed that men were more likely to be selected for leadership roles than women. However, a recent study by Burke, Stets, and Cerven found that even when women were selected into a formal managerial role they used more of the resources they had at their disposal. The researchers attributed this finding to women's "trying harder" to succeed in light of self-perceptions that they were of lower competence than men in similar positions.

The second piece of evidence was that men should show even more signs of leadership emergence when the task is masculine in nature. Dovidio and colleagues' study is particularly supportive of this second necessary piece of evidence. First, men showed higher levels of verbal and nonverbal communication than women on a gender-neutral task. However, when the dyads worked on a masculine task (discussing changing oil in a car), the difference became ever greater. The study also provided support for the third piece of evidence (i.e. women should show slightly greater signs of leadership emergence when task is feminine in nature) because when the topic shifted to feminine in nature women actually exhibited greater power. Providing further evidence that status beliefs are central to these phenomena, several studies have shown that no differences appear when the task is performed in same sex groups.

Finally, differences in leadership emergence should be mediated by competence perceptions. This evidence is that in a study by Wood and Karten. The researchers displayed that status based assumptions regarding men's superior competence mediated the tendency for men to evidence higher levels of leadership emergence in mixed gender settings. This study further supported the notion that it is status, not inherent strengths/weakness of gender differences, which foster gender inequality.

As an additional note, there is also considerable research evidence that evaluations of women's performance in leadership roles mirrors the effects found in the previously discussed literature on leadership emergence. Indeed, men Eagly, Karau, & Makhijani found that men were rated as more effective overall, and that the effect was stronger for masculine tasks. Also consistent with the previously described findings, women were evaluated as more effective in feminine settings. Similarly, a recent study of men and women performing both masculine and feminine tasks found that women were only received similar performance evaluations to men if their leadership status was legitimated through a title.

=== Methods ===
Qualitative, experimental and correlational studies are all used to test the predictions of expectations states theory. In the development of the theory, Berger et al. (1972) draw from qualitative studies and correlational studies to try to reconcile mixed findings. Then they use small groups in experimental studies to test subsequent predictions. In her review, Ridgeway (2001) cites both experimental small groups studies (like the ones in Berger et al., 1972) and correlational studies. Overall, the favored method seems to be experimental small groups studies, but correlational methods are also used.

== Other social groups ==
As previously suggested, expectation states theory does not apply to gender exclusively. In support of this, empirical evidence supports the double standard predicted by Ridgeway, whereby in order to prove their competency, lower status groups must achieve higher levels of performance than higher status groups. A number of studies confirm that double standards emerge not only for gender, but also for other social categories, such as race.

== Practical implications ==
=== Macro-level applicability ===
In general, much of the research regarding expectation states theory does not speak to the larger question of whether the theory can account for macro level gender inequality. However, a recent study by Brashears utilized an innovative methodology to show that large scale cross national trends are consistent with the predictions of expectation states (or status construction) theory. The study used the frequency with which respondents indicated their best friend to be female as a surrogate for status. They found that individuals were more likely to report their best friend to be a female in countries which have a higher percentage of females working in supervisory positions. This supports the notion that status beliefs regarding gender are weaker (or at least less salient) in nations in which women possess more authority. While the evidence was not causal, it does provide an indication that expectation states theory does have the potential to explain large scale gender inequality.

=== Implications for everyday life ===
Expectation states theory focuses on how status beliefs are enacted in everyday life. While the theory does address the origins of status belief, the focus is instead on how these status beliefs influence people's attitudes, perceptions, and behavior. This clearly has practical implications in any situation in which status distinction can be particularly salient. In such situations, where members of one group are perceived to have greater status and legitimacy than members of another, expectation states theory can be useful in predicting how members of both the higher and lower status groups will act and treat one another. This theory describes how individuals with higher status tend are more likely to be listened to, receive more positive evaluations, and exert greater influence than individuals with lower status. Conversely, individuals in lower status positions will be more likely to defer to those with high status.

With regard to gender, the theory generally predicts that men will tend to have basic advantages in mixed group settings, even when performing a gender-neutral task. In general, men will be expected to exercise the authority conferred by their perceived structural advantages that cross social contexts (e.g., higher pay), and will be more likely to be recognized and rewarded for doing so. In exercising such power based on status, they will often be expected to talk more, make more suggestions, and display more assertive gestures that will women. In the traditional workplace, where many traditional roles as masculinized, Expectation states theory suggests this would form the basis for gendered inequality.

In the workplace, another clear example of the applicability of expectation states theory is in predicting backlash against female leaders in an organization. According to this theory, since women are often ascribed a position of lower status than men, when a woman in a leadership role exercises authority, expectation states theory predicts that there may be a backlash against her, on the grounds that her power is perceived to be illegitimate. Expectation states theory can be used to explain (and be used as a means to counter) situations such as these.

=== Implications for social change ===
According to expectation states theory (e.g., Ridgeway & Bourg), inequality arises when members of one group are perceived to have greater status and prestige than members of another group. This distinction occurs when members of a particular social group systematically perceive that some members have a structural advantage (such as more money, knowledge, or other resources). These systematic perceptions develop as individuals share and reinforce these beliefs among one another, legitimizing such beliefs as members of both high and low status groups act on their ascribed social status. By understanding how these beliefs form and lead to certain groups becoming marginalized, expectation states theory provides an avenue for breaking this pattern. According to this theory, positive social change would involve disruption of the formation of these status beliefs, thereby reducing the formation of status distinctions that drive inequality.

== Glossary ==
Interpersonal status hierarchy

When groups of people interact, some people are given more social esteem and influence than others. The emergence of these differences creates a hierarchy within the group.

Status beliefs

"Widely held cultural beliefs that link greater social significance and general competences, as well as positive and negative skills, with one category of social distinction compared to another" (Ridgeway, 2001 p. 638).

Diffuse status characteristics

A cue that indicates a person belongs to a particular social group (e.g., a person looks female; a person seems to have lower SES) and, with recognition of that cue, the activation of the associated stereotypic traits. Diffuse status characteristics operate if one set of associated stereotypic traits (e.g., for men: strategic, leader-like) is valued more than the others (e.g., for women: supportive, nurturing) and individuals associated with the more valued traits are expected to be more competent at specific tasks.

Specific status characteristics:

A cue that indicates a person, regardless of social group, has some level instrumentality for the specific goal at hand. For example, a person who is introduced as an expert in her field (relevant to the group's goal) will have more status than other members of the group who do not have expertise, regardless of the fact that she is female (a group that has lower social status). Similar to diffuse status characteristics, but does not include the third requirement of one group being expected to be more competent at a wide variety of tasks.
