= Filipe Carreira da Silva =

Portuguese social theorist

Filipe Carreira da Silva (born 29 April 1975 in Zimbabwe) is a Zimbabwean-born Portuguese social theorist at the Institute of Social Sciences of the University of Lisbon and at Selwyn College, Cambridge. He specializes in American philosophical pragmatism, critical theory and intellectual history of the twentieth century. He is the author or co-author of ten books, and the editor or co-editor of seven others, and he has also published more than thirty articles. He has a monthly column in the Portuguese daily newspaper Público.

== Early life ==
Filipe Carreira da Silva was born in Zimbabwe, but grew up in Lisbon, Portugal. He graduated in sociology at ISCTE (1993–1998), where he subsequently became a lecturer in sociological theory (1998–2000). In 2000, he was admitted to the PhD programme in sociology at the University of Cambridge.

== Career ==
In 2010 he won the American Sociological Association Distinguished Publication Award (History of Sociology), with Mead and Modernity. Science, Selfhood, and Democratic Politics. Lanham, MD: Lexington Books, 2008.

He is a senior research fellow at the Institute of Social Sciences of the University of Lisbon, which he joined in 2005. In 2016, he obtained the Habilitation for Research Direction (HDR), later published as The Politics of the Book. A Study on the Materiality of Ideas (Penn University Press, 2019).

He has been a fellow of Selwyn College since 2014. He has also served as a graduate tutor since 2016, and as a director of studies in HSPS in 2017–2018.

He has been an affiliated lecturer in the department of sociology at Cambridge since 2013, where he teaches contemporary social theory.

He is the founding co-editor (with Mónica Brito Vieira) of the book series Theory Workshop. New Frontiers in Social and Political Theory (Brill).

He was a visiting scholar at the University of Chicago (2001–2002), University of Harvard (2003–2004), Hebrew University (2009), and at the University of Yale (2011–2012).

== Chief publications ==
- (with Mónica Brito Vieira) The Politics of the Book. A Study on the Materiality of Ideas (Penn State University Press, 2019)
- (co-edited with Marina Costa Lobo and José Pedro Zúquete) Changing Societies: Legacies and Challenges. Citizenship in Crisis (Imprensa de Ciências Sociais, 2018)
- Sociology in Portugal. A Short History (Palgrave Macmillan, 2015)
- O Futuro do Estado Social (FFMS, 2013)
- (co-edited with Pedro Alcântara da Silva) Ciências Sociais: Vocação e Profissão (Imprensa de Ciências Sociais, 2013)
- (edited) Os Portugueses e o Estado Providência (Imprensa de Ciências Sociais, 2013)
- (with Patrick Baert). Social Theory in the Twentieth Century and Beyond. (Polity Press, 2010) (Translations into Italian: 2010. Teoria Sociale Contemporanea. Bologna: Societá Editrice Il Mulino; Spanish: 2011. La Teoría Social Contemporánea. Madrid: Alianza Editorial; Polish: 2013. Krakow: Zaklad Wadawniczy Nomos; Portuguese: 2014. Teoria Social Contemporânea. Lisboa: Mundos Sociais; Chinese: 2014. The Commercial Press)
- (edited) G.H. Mead. A Reader (Routledge, 2011)
- (edited) As Grandes Revoluções e as Civilizações da Modernidade, S.N. Eisenstadt. (Edições 70, 2011)
- (with Mónica Brito Vieira) O Momento Constituinte. Os Direitos Sociais na Constituição (Almedina, 2010)
- Em Diálogo com os Tempos Modernos. O Pensamento Social e Político de G.H. Mead (Tempo Brasileiro, 2009)
- (co-edited with Manuel Villaverde Cabral, Karin Wall, Sofia Aboim) Itinerários. A Investigação nos 25 Anos do ICS (Imprensa de Ciências Sociais, 2008)
- (co-edited with Manuel Villaverde Cabral and Tiago Saraiva) Cidade e Cidadania. Governação urbana e participação cidadã em perspectiva comparada (Imprensa de Ciências Sociais, 2008)
- Mead and Modernity. Science, Selfhood, and Democratic Politics (Lexington Books, 2008)
- G.H. Mead. A Critical Introduction (Polity Press, 2007)
- Virtude e Democracia. Um Ensaio sobre Ideias Republicanas. Lisboa: Imprensa de Ciências Sociais, 2004. (Translation into Spanish: Virtud y Democracia. Ideas Republicanas en el Pensamiento Contemporáneo. Biblioteca Nueva, 2009)
- Habermas e o Espaço Público (Imprensa de Ciências Sociais, 2002)
