= Social psychology (sociology) =

Relationship between the individual and society

In sociology, social psychology (also known as sociological social psychology) studies the relationship between the individual and society. Although studying many of the same substantive topics as its counterpart in the field of psychology, sociological social psychology places more emphasis on society, rather than the individual; the influence of social structure and culture on individual outcomes, such as personality, behavior, and one's position in social hierarchies. Researchers broadly focus on higher levels of analysis, directing attention mainly to groups and the arrangement of relationships among people. This subfield of sociology is broadly recognized as having three major perspectives: Symbolic interactionism, social structure and personality, and structural social psychology.

Some of the major topics in this field include social status, structural power, sociocultural change, social inequality and prejudice, leadership and intra-group behavior, social exchange, group conflict, impression formation and management, conversation structures, socialization, social constructionism, social norms and deviance, identity and roles, and emotional labor.

The primary methods of data collection are sample surveys, field observations, vignette studies, field experiments, and controlled experiments.

== History ==
Sociological social psychology is understood to have emerged in 1902 with a landmark study by sociologist Charles Cooley, entitled Human Nature and the Social Order, in which he introduces the concept of the looking-glass self. Sociologist Edward Alsworth Ross would subsequently publish the first sociological textbook in social psychology, known as Social Psychology, in 1908. Following a few decades later, Jacob L. Moreno would go on to found the field's major academic journal in 1937, entitled Sociometry—though its name would change in 1978 to Social Psychology and to its current title, Social Psychology Quarterly, the year after.

=== Foundational concepts ===
==== Symbolic interactionism ====
In the 1920s, William and Dorothy Thomas introduced what would become not only a basic tenet of sociological social psychology, but of sociology in general. In 1923, the two proposed the concept of definition of the situation, followed in 1928 by the Thomas theorem (or Thomas axiom):

If men define situations as real, they are real in their consequences.

— Thomas & Thomas, The Child in America: Behavior Problems and Programs (1928), p. 572

This subjective definition of situation by social actors, groups, or subcultures would be interpreted by Robert K. Merton as a self-fulfilling prophecy (i.e., mind over matter), becoming a core concept of what would form the theory of symbolic interactionism.

Generally credited as the founder of symbolic interactionism is University of Chicago philosopher and sociologist George Herbert Mead, whose work greatly influences the area of social psychology in general. However, it would be sociologist Herbert Blumer, Mead's colleague and disciple at Chicago, who coined the name of the framework in 1937.

==== Action theory ====
At Harvard University, sociologist Talcott Parsons began developing a cybernetic theory of action in 1927, which would subsequently be adapted to small group research by Parsons' student and colleague, Robert Freed Bales. Using Bales' behavior coding scheme, interaction process analysis, would result in a body of observational studies in social interactions in groups. During his 41-year tenure at Harvard, Bales mentored a distinguished group of sociological social psychologists concerned with group processes and other topics in sociological social psychology.

== Major frameworks ==
=== Symbolic interactionism ===
The contemporary notion of symbolic interactionism originates from the work of George Herbert Mead and Max Weber. In this circular framework, social interactions are considered to be the basis from which meanings are constructed; meanings that then influence the process of social interaction itself. Many symbolic interactionists see the self as a core meaning that is both constructed through and influential in social relations.

The structural school of symbolic interactionism uses shared social knowledge from a macro-level culture, natural language, social institution, or organization to explain relatively enduring patterns of social interaction and psychology at the micro-level, typically investigating these matters with quantitative methods. The Iowa School, along with identity theory and affect control theory, are major programs of research in this tradition. The latter two theories, in particular, focus on the ways in which actions control mental states, which demonstrates the underlying cybernetic nature of the approach that is also evident in Mead's writings. Moreover, affect control theory provides a mathematical model of role theory and of labeling theory.

Stemming from the Chicago School, process symbolic interactionism considers the meanings that underlie social interactions to be situated, creative, fluid, and often contested. As such, researchers in this tradition frequently use qualitative and ethnographic methods. Symbolic Interaction, an academic journal founded by the Society for the Study of Symbolic Interaction, emerged in 1977 as a central outlet for the empirical research and conceptual studies produced by scholars in this area.

Postmodern symbolic interactionism, which understands the notion of self and identity as increasingly fragmented and illusory, considers attempts at theory to be metanarrative with no more authority than other conversations. The approach is presented in detail by The SAGE Handbook of Qualitative Research.

=== Social structure and personality ===
This research perspective deals with relationships between large-scale social systems and individual behaviors and mental states including feelings, attitudes and values, and mental faculties. Some researchers focus on issues of health and how social networks bring useful social support to the ill. Another line of research deals with how education, occupation, and other components of social class impact values. Some studies assess emotional variations, especially in happiness versus alienation and anger, among individuals in different structural positions.

=== Structural social psychology ===
Structural social psychology diverges from the other two dominant approaches to sociological social psychology in that its theories seek to explain the emergence and maintenance of social structures by actors (whether people, groups, or organizations), generally assuming greater stability in social structure (especially compared to symbolic interactionism), and most notably assuming minimal differences between individual actors. Whereas the other two approaches to social psychology attempt to model social reality closely, structural social psychology strives for parsimony, aiming to explain the widest range of phenomena possible, while making the fewest assumptions possible. Structural social psychology makes greater use of formal theories with explicitly stated propositions and scope conditions, to specify the intended range of application.

==== Social exchange ====
Social exchange theory emphasizes the notion that social action is the result of personal choices that are made in order to maximize benefit while minimizing cost. A key component of this theory is the postulation of the "comparison level of alternatives": an actor's sense of the best possible alternative in a given situation (i.e. the choice with the highest net benefits or lowest net costs; similar to the concept of a "cost-benefit analysis").

Theories of social exchange share many essential features with classical economic theories, such as rational choice theory. However, social exchange theories differ from classical economics in that social exchange makes predictions about the relationships between persons, rather than just the evaluation of goods. For example, social exchange theories have been used to predict human behavior in romantic relationships by taking into account each actor's subjective sense of cost (e.g., financial dependence), benefit (e.g. attraction, chemistry, attachment), and comparison level of alternatives (e.g. whether or not there are any viable alternative mates available).

==== Expectation states and Status characteristics ====
Expectation states theory—as well as its popular sub-theory, status characteristics theory—proposes that individuals use available social information to form expectations for themselves and others. Group members, for instance, use stereotypes about competence in attempting to determine who will be comparatively more skilled in a given task, which then indicates one's authority and status in the group. In order to determine everyone else's relative ability and assign rank accordingly, such members use one's membership in social categories (e.g. race, gender, age, education, etc.); their known ability on immediate tasks; and their observed dominant behaviors (e.g. glares, rate of speech, interruptions, etc.).

Although exhibiting dominant behaviors and, for example, belonging to a certain race has no direct connection to actual ability, implicit cultural beliefs about who possesses how much social value will drive group members to "act as if" they believe some people have more useful contributions than others. As such, the theory has been used to explain the rise, persistence, and enactment of status hierarchies.

== Substantive topics ==
=== Social influence ===
Social influence is a factor in every individual's life. Social influence takes place when one's thoughts, actions and feelings are affected by other people. It is a way of interaction that affects individual behavior and can occur within groups and between groups. It is a fundamental process that affects ways of socialization, conformity, leadership and social change.

=== Dramaturgy ===
Another aspect of microsociology aims to focus on individual behavior in social settings. One specific researcher in the field, Erving Goffman, claims that humans tend to believe that they are actors on a stage, which he explains in the book The Presentation of Self in Everyday Life. He argues that as a result, individuals will further proceed with their actions based on the response of that individual's 'audience' or in other words, the people to whom he is speaking. Much like a play, Goffman believes that rules of conversing and communication exist: to display confidence, display sincerity, and avoid infractions which are otherwise known as embarrassing situations. Breaches of such rules are what make social situations awkward.

=== Group dynamics (group processes) ===
From a sociological perspective, group dynamics refers to the ways in which power, status, justice, and legitimacy impact the structure and interactions that take place within groups. A particular area of study, in which scholars examine how group size affects the type and quality of interactions that take place between group members, was introduced by the work of German social theorist, Georg Simmel. Those who study group processes also study interactions between groups, such as in the case of Muzafer Sherif's Robbers Cave Experiment.

Initially, groups can be characterized as either dyads (two people) or triads (three people), where the essential difference is that, if one person were to leave a dyad, that group would dissolve completely, while the same is not true of a triad. What this difference indicates is the fundamental nature of group size: every additional member of a group increases the group's stability while decreasing the possible amount of intimacy or interactions between any two members.

A group can also be distinguished in terms of how and why its members know each other. In this sense, individual group members belong to one of the following:

- Primary group: Consists of close friends and family who are held together by expressive ties;
- Secondary group: Consists of coworkers, colleagues, classmates, and so on, who are held together by instrumental ties; or
- Reference group: Consists of people who do not necessarily know or interact with each other, but who use each other for standards of comparison for appropriate behaviors.

== See also ==
- Behavioral economics
- List of social psychologists
- Political psychology
- Social psychology (discipline within psychology)
- Socialization
- Sociobiology
- Sociology
- Socionics
