= Sheldon Stryker =

American sociologist

Sheldon Stryker (1924–2016) was an American sociologist. Born in St. Paul, Minnesota, on May 26, 1924, Stryker was raised by his grandfather and his aunts after his mother died. He sought to enlist in the United States Army in 1942, but was rejected due to bad vision. Stryker was drafted and became a combat medic the next year. After World War II ended, he enrolled at the University of Minnesota to study social work. Stryker changed his major to sociology and later completed a doctorate in the subject at UM in 1955. He taught at Indiana University, Bloomington from 1950 to 2002. Stryker served as editor in chief of Social Psychology Quarterly from 1967 to 1969, and assumed an equivalent role for the American Sociological Review between 1982 and 1986. He died on May 4, 2016, in Sarasota, Florida, aged 91, of surgical complications.

Stryker's significant contribution to sociology was in the area of sociological social psychology. With his book entitled Symbolic Interactionism: A Social Structural Version, he provided an elusive linkage between personality and social structure. His book represents a herculean task in sociology.
