= Social Psychology Quarterly =

- Discipline: Social psychology
- Language: English

Publication details
- Former names: Sociometry, Social Psychology
- History: 1937-present
- Publisher: SAGE Publications on behalf of the American Sociological Association
- Frequency: Quarterly
- Impact factor: 2.341 (2017)

Standard abbreviations
- ISO 4: Soc. Psychol. Q.

Indexing
- ISSN: 0190-2725 (print); 1939-8999 (web)
- JSTOR: 01902725
- OCLC no.: 643521364

Links
- Journal homepage; Online access; Online archive

Social Psychology Quarterly is a peer-reviewed academic journal that publishes theoretical and empirical papers in the field of social psychology. The editors-in-chief are Jody Clay-Warner, Dawn Robinson, and Justine Tinkler (University of Georgia). It is published by SAGE Publications on behalf of the American Sociological Association, of which this is an official journal.

== History ==
The journal was established in 1937 under the title Sociometry by Jacob L. Moreno, who served as publisher and chair of the editorial committee until 1955. In 1955, Moreno transferred ownership of the journal to the American Sociological Society (now the American Sociological Association), which has published the journal continuously since then. The journal's name was changed to Social Psychology in 1978 and it obtained its current name in 1979.

== Abstracting and indexing ==
Social Psychology Quarterly is abstracted and indexed in Scopus and the Social Sciences Citation Index. According to the Journal Citation Reports, its 2017 impact factor is 2.341, ranking it 18th out of 64 journals in the category "Psychology, Social".

== Past Editors ==
The following persons have been editors-in-chief of the journal:

- Brent Simpson and Matthew Brashears (University of South Carolina) (2018-2020)
- Richard T. Serpe (Kent State University) & Jan E. Stets (University of California - Riverside) (2015-2017)
- Karen A. Hegtvedt (Emory University, 2014)
- Karen A. Hegtvedt & Cathryn Johnson (Emory University, 2011-2013)
- Gary Alan Fine (Northwestern University, 2007-2010)
- Spencer Cahill (University of South Florida, 2004-2006)
- Cecilia L. Ridgeway (Stanford University 2001-2003)
- Linda Molm & Lynn Smith-Lovin (University of Arizona, 1997-2000)
- Edward J. Lawler (University of Iowa, 1993-1996)
- Karen Cook (University of Washington, 1988-1992)
- Peter J. Burke (Indiana University, Bloomington, 1983-1987)
- George W. Bohrnstedt (Indiana University, Bloomington, 1980-1982)
- Howard Schuman (University of Michigan, 1977-1979)
- Richard J. Hill (University of Oregon, 1973-1976)
- Carl W. Backman (University of Nevada, Reno, 1970-1972)
- Sheldon Stryker (Indiana University, Bloomington, 1967-1969)
- Melvin F. Seeman (University of California, Los Angeles, 1965-1966)
- Ralph H. Turner (University of California, Los Angeles, 1962-1964)
- John A. Clausen (National Institutes of Health, 1959-1961)
- Leonard S. Cottrell (Russell Sage Foundation, 1956-1958)
- Edgar F. Borgatta (Harvard University, 1952-1955)
- Frederick M. Thrasher (New York University, 1951)
- Helen H. Jennings (New York University, 1950)
- Jacob L. Moreno (Columbia University, 1947-1949)
- George A. Lundberg (Bennington College, 1941-1946)
- Gardner Murphy (Columbia University, 1937-1940)

== See also ==
- ASA style
