= George Herbert Mead =

American philosopher (1863–1931)

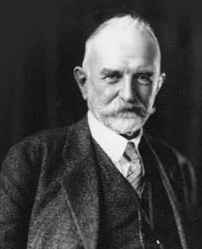
- Born: February 27, 1863; South Hadley, Massachusetts, U.S.
- Died: April 26, 1931; Chicago, Illinois, U.S.

Education
- Education: Oberlin College; Harvard University
- Academic advisor: Josiah Royce

Philosophical work
- Era: 20th-century philosophy
- Region: Western philosophy
- School: Pragmatism
- Institutions: University of Michigan; University of Chicago
- Doctoral students: Ellsworth Faris; Charles W. Morris
- Notable works: Mind, Self and Society

George Herbert Mead (February 27, 1863 – April 26, 1931) was an American philosopher, sociologist, and psychologist, primarily affiliated with the University of Chicago. He was one of the key figures in the development of pragmatism. He is regarded as one of the founders of symbolic interactionism, and was an important influence on what has come to be referred to as the Chicago School of Sociology.

== Biography ==
George Herbert Mead was born on February 27, 1863, in South Hadley, Massachusetts. He was raised in a Protestant, middle-class family comprising his father, Hiram Mead, his mother, Elizabeth Storrs Mead (née Billings), and his sister Alice. His father was a former Congregationalist pastor from a lineage of farmers and clergymen and who later held the chair in Sacred Rhetoric and Pastoral Theology at Oberlin College's theological seminary. Elizabeth taught for two years at Oberlin College and subsequently, from 1890 to 1900, served as president of Mount Holyoke College in South Hadley, Massachusetts.

In 1879, George Mead enrolled at the Oberlin Academy at Oberlin College and then the college itself, graduating in 1883 with a Bachelor of Arts. After graduation, Mead taught grade school for about four months. From the end of 1883 through the summer of 1887, he worked as a surveyor for the Wisconsin Central Railroad Company.

In 1891, Mead married Helen Kingsbury Castle (1860–1929), the sister of Henry Northrup Castle (1862–1895), a friend he met at Oberlin. Despite never finishing his dissertation, Mead was able to obtain a post at the University of Michigan in 1891. There, Mead met Charles Horton Cooley and John Dewey, both of whom would influence him greatly. In 1894, Mead moved, along with Dewey, to the University of Chicago, where he taught until his death. Dewey's influence led Mead into educational theory, but his thinking soon diverged from that of Dewey, and developed into his famous psychological theories of mind, self and society.

He was active in Chicago's social and political affairs; his many activities include work for the City Club of Chicago. Mead believed that science could be used to deal with social problems and played a key role in conducting research at the settlement house in Chicago. He also worked as treasurer for Chicago's Hull House. He also collaborated closely with Jane Addams on matters of social justice.

Mead died of heart failure on April 26, 1931. He had submitted his resignation to the University of Chicago three months earlier over the hiring of Mortimer J. Adler and was intending to join Columbia University, but died before that could happen.

== Theory ==
=== Pragmatism and symbolic interactionism ===
Much of Mead's work focused on the development of the self and the objectivity of the world within the social realm: he insisted that "the individual mind can exist only in relation to other minds with shared meanings". The two most important roots of Mead's work, and of symbolic interactionism in general, are the philosophy of pragmatism and social behaviorism.

Social behaviorism (as opposed to psychological behaviorism) refers to Mead's concern of the stimuli of gestures and social objects with rich meanings, rather than bare physical objects which psychological behaviourists considered stimuli. Mead was a critic of John B. Watson's form of behaviorism.

Pragmatism is a wide-ranging philosophical position from which several aspects of Mead's influences can be identified into four main tenets:

1. True reality does not exist "out there" in the real world, it "is actively created as we act in and toward the world".
2. People remember and base their knowledge of the world on what has been useful to them and are likely to alter what no longer "works".
3. People define the social and physical "objects" they encounter in the world according to their use for them.
4. If we want to understand actors, we must base that understanding on what people actually do.

Three of these ideas are critical to symbolic interactionism:

- the focus on the interaction between the actor and the world;
- a view of both the actor and the world as dynamic processes and not static structures; and
- the actor's ability to interpret the social world.

Thus, to Mead and symbolic interactionists, consciousness is not separated from action and interaction, but is an integral part of both. Symbolic interactionism as a pragmatic philosophy was an antecedent to the philosophy of transactionalism. Mead's theories in part, based on pragmatism and behaviorism, were transmitted to many graduate students at the University of Chicago who then went on to establish symbolic interactionism.

=== Social philosophy (social behaviorism) ===
Mead was a very important figure in 20th-century social philosophy. One of his most influential ideas was the emergence of mind and self from the communication process between organisms, discussed in Mind, Self and Society (1934), also known as social behaviorism. This concept of how the mind and self emerge from the social process of communication by signs founded the symbolic interactionist school of sociology.

Rooted intellectually in Hegelian dialectics and process philosophy, Mead, like John Dewey, developed a more materialist process philosophy that was based upon human action and specifically communicative action. Human activity is, in a pragmatic sense, the criterion of truth, and through human activity meaning is made. Joint activity, including communicative activity, is the means through which our sense of self is constituted. The essence of Mead's social behaviorism is that mind is not a substance located in some transcendent realm, nor is it merely a series of events that takes place within the human physiological structure. This approach opposed the traditional view of the mind as separate from the body. The emergence of mind is contingent upon interaction between the human organism and its social environment; it is through participation in the social act of communication that individuals realize their potential for significantly symbolic behavior—that is, thought. Mind, in Mead's terms, is the individualized focus of the communication process. It is linguistic behavior on the part of the individual. There is, then, no "mind or thought without language"; and language (the content of mind) "is only a development and product of social interaction". Thus, mind is not reducible to the neurophysiology of the organic individual, but is emergent in "the dynamic, ongoing social process" that constitutes human experience.

For Mead, mind arises out of the social act of communication. Mead's concept of the social act is relevant not only to his theory of mind, but to all facets of his social philosophy. His theory of "mind, self, and society" is, in effect, a philosophy of the act from the standpoint of a social process involving the interaction of many individuals, just as his theory of knowledge and value is a philosophy of the act from the standpoint of the experiencing individual in interaction with an environment. Action is very important to his social theory and, according to Mead, actions also occur within a communicative process.

The initial phase of an act constitutes a gesture. A gesture is a preparatory movement that enables other individuals to become aware of the intentions of the given organism. The rudimentary situation is a conversation of gestures, in which a gesture on the part of the first individual evokes a preparatory movement on the part of the second, and the gesture of the second organism in turn calls out a response in the first person. On this level no communication occurs. Neither organism is aware of the effect of its own gestures upon the other; the gestures are nonsignificant. For communication to take place, each organism must have knowledge of how the other individual will respond to its own ongoing act. Here the gestures are significant symbols. A significant symbol is a kind of gesture that only humans can make. (Note: This has been a contentious issue in the burgeoning field of Human Animal Studies. For a discussion see: Wilkie, Rhoda, and Andrew McKinnon. 2013. "George Herbert Mead on Humans and Other Animals: Social Relations after Human-Animal Studies." Sociological Research Online 18(4):19.) Gestures become significant symbols when they arouse in the individual who is making them the same kind of response they are supposed to elicit from those to whom the gestures are addressed. Only when we have significant symbols can we truly have communication. Mead grounded human perception in an "action-nexus". We perceive the world in terms of the "means of living." To perceive food is to perceive eating. To perceive a house is to perceive shelter. That is to say, perception is in terms of action. Mead's theory of perception is similar to that of J. J. Gibson.

==== Social acts ====
Mead argued, in tune with Durkheim, that the individual is a product of an ongoing, pre-existing society; or, more specifically, of social interaction that is a consequence of a sui generis society. The self arises when the individual becomes an object to themself. Mead argued that we are objects first to other people, and secondarily we become objects to ourselves by taking the perspective of other people. Language enables us to talk about ourselves in the same way as we talk about other people, and thus through language we become other to ourselves. In joint activity, which Mead called social acts, humans learn to see themselves from the standpoint of their co-actors. A central mechanism within the social act, which enables perspective taking, is position exchange. People within a social act often alternate social positions (e.g., giving/receiving, asking/helping, winning/losing, hiding/seeking, talking/listening). In children's games there is repeated position exchange, for example in hide-and-seek, and Mead argued that this is one of the main ways that perspective taking develops.

However, for Mead, unlike Dewey and J. J. Gibson, the key is not simply human action, but rather social action. In humans the "manipulatory phase of the act" is socially mediated; that is to say, in acting towards objects humans simultaneously take the perspectives of others toward that object. This is what Mead means by "the social act" as opposed to simply "the act" (the latter being a Deweyan concept). Non-human animals also manipulate objects, but that is a non-social manipulation; they do not take the perspective of other organisms toward the object. Humans, on the other hand, take the perspective of other actors towards objects, and this is what enables complex human society and subtle social coordination. In the social act of economic exchange, for example, both buyer and seller must take each other's perspectives toward the object being exchanged. The seller must recognize the value for the buyer, while the buyer must recognize the desirability of money for the seller. Only with this mutual perspective taking can the economic exchange occur. (Mead was influenced on this point by Adam Smith.)

=== Nature of the self ===
A final piece of Mead's social theory is the mind as the individual importation of the social process. Mead states that "the self is a social process", meaning that there are series of actions that go on in the mind to help formulate one's complete self. As gestures are taken in by the individual organism, the individual organism also takes in the collective attitudes of others, in the form of gestures, and reacts accordingly with other organized attitudes. This process is characterized by Mead as the I and the Me. The 'Me' is the social self and the 'I' is the response to the 'Me'. In other words, the 'I' is the response of an individual to the attitudes of others, while the 'Me' is the organized set of attitudes of others which an individual assumes.

Mead develops William James' distinction between the 'I' and the 'Me'. The 'Me' is the accumulated understanding of "the generalized other—i.e., how one thinks one's group perceives oneself, and so on. The 'I' is the individual's impulses. The 'I' is self as subject; the 'Me' is self as object. The 'I' is the knower; the 'Me' is the known. The mind, or stream of thought, is the self-reflective movements of the interaction between the 'I' and the 'Me'. There is neither 'I' nor 'Me' in the conversation of gestures; the whole act is not yet carried out, but the preparation takes place in this field of gesture. These dynamics go beyond selfhood in a narrow sense, and form the basis of a theory of human cognition. For Mead the thinking process is the internalized dialogue between the 'I' and the 'Me'. Mead rooted the self's "perception and meaning" deeply and sociologically in "a common praxis of subjects", found specifically in social encounters.

Understood as a combination of the 'I' and the 'Me', Mead's self proves to be noticeably entwined within a sociological existence. For Mead, existence in community comes before individual consciousness. First one must participate in the different social positions within society and only subsequently can one use that experience to take the perspective of others and thus become 'conscious'.

=== Philosophy of science ===
Mead was a major American philosopher by virtue of being—along with John Dewey, Charles Peirce and William James— one of the founders of pragmatism. He also made significant contributions to the philosophies of nature, science, and history, to philosophical anthropology, and to process philosophy. Dewey and Alfred North Whitehead considered Mead a thinker of the first rank. He is a classic example of a social theorist whose work does not fit easily within conventional disciplinary boundaries.

In his work on philosophy of science, Mead sought to find the psychological origin of science in the efforts of individuals to attain power over their environment. The notion of a physical object arises out of manipulatory experience. There is a social relation to inanimate objects, for the organism takes the role of things that it manipulates directly, or that it manipulates indirectly in perception. For example, in taking (introjecting or imitating) the resistant role of a solid object, an individual obtains cognition of what is "inside" nonliving things. Historically, the concept of the physical object arose from an animistic conception of the universe.

Contact experience includes experiences of position, balance, and support, and these are used by the organism when it creates its conceptions of the physical world. Our scientific concepts of space, time, and mass are abstracted from manipulatory experience. Such concepts as that of the electron are also derived from manipulation. In developing a science we construct hypothetical objects in order to assist ourselves in controlling nature. The conception of the present as a distinct unit of experience, rather than as a process of becoming and disappearing, is a scientific fiction devised to facilitate exact measurement. In the scientific worldview, immediate experience is replaced by theoretical constructs. The ultimate in experience, however, is the manipulation and contact at the completion of an act.

=== Play and game and the generalized other ===
Mead theorized that human beings begin their understanding of the social world through "play" and "game". Play comes first in the child's development. The child takes different roles that they observe in "adult" society, and play them out to gain an understanding of the different social roles. For instance, a child may first play the role of police officer and then the role of thief while playing "Cops and Robbers", and play the roles of doctor and patient when playing "Doctor". As a result of such play, the child learns to become both subject and object and begins to become able to build a self. However, it is a limited self, because the child can only take the role of distinct and separate others; they still lack a more general and organized sense of themself.

In the next stage, the game stage, it is required that a person develop a full sense of self. Whereas in the play stage the child takes on the role of distinct others, in the game stage the child must take on the role of everyone else involved in the game. Furthermore, these roles must have a definite relationship to one another. To illustrate the game stage, Mead gives his famous example of a baseball game:

But in a game where a number of individuals are involved, then the child taking one role must be ready to take the role of everyone else. If he gets in a ball nine he must have the responses of each position involved in his own position. He must know what everyone else is going to do in order to carry out his own play. He has to take all of these roles. They do not all have to be present in consciousness at the same time, but at some moments he has to have three or four individuals present in his own attitude, such as the one who is going to throw the ball, the one who is going to catch it and so on. These responses must be, in some degree, present in his own make-up. In the game, then, there is a set of responses of such others so organized that the attitude of one calls out the appropriate attitudes of the other.

In the game stage, organization begins and definite personalities start to emerge. Children begin to become able to function in organized groups and, most importantly, to determine what they will do within a specific group. Mead calls this the child's first encounter with "the generalized other", which is one of the main concepts that Mead proposes for understanding the emergence of the (social) self in human beings. "The generalized other" can be thought of as understanding the given activity and the actors' place within the activity from the perspective of all the others engaged in the activity. Through understanding "the generalized other", the individual understands what kind of behavior is expected, appropriate and so on, in different social settings.

Some may find that social acts (e.g. games and routine forms of social interaction) enable perspective taking through "position exchange". Assuming that games and routine social acts have differentiated social positions, and that these positions create our cognitive perspectives, then it might be that by moving between roles in a game (e.g. between hiding and seeking or buying and selling) we come to learn about the perspective of the other. This new interpretation of Mead's account of taking the perspective of the other has experimental support. Other recent publications argue that Mead's account of the development of perspective taking is relevant not only with respect to human ontogeny but also to the evolution of human sociality.

== Writings ==
In a career spanning more than 40 years, Mead wrote almost constantly and published numerous articles and book reviews in both philosophy and psychology. However, he did not publish any books. Following his death, several of his students put together and edited four volumes from records of Mead's social psychology course at the University of Chicago, his lecture notes (Mead's Carus Lectures, 1930, edited by Charles W. Morris), and his numerous unpublished papers.

In his lifetime, Mead published around 100 scholarly articles, reviews, and incidental pieces. Given their diverse nature, access to these writings is difficult. The first editorial efforts to change this situation date from the 1960s. In 1964, Andrew J. Reck collected twenty-five of Mead's published articles in Selected Writings: George Herbert Mead. Four years later, John W. Petras published George Herbert Mead: Essays on his Social Psychology, a collection of fifteen articles that included previously unpublished manuscripts.

More recently, Mary Jo Deegan (2001) published Essays in Social Psychology, a book project originally abandoned by Mead in the early 1910s. In 2010, Filipe Carreira da Silva edited G.H. Mead. A Reader, a comprehensive collection including thirty of Mead's most important articles, ten of them previously unpublished. Likewise, the Mead Project at Brock University in Toronto intends to publish all of Mead's 80-odd remaining unpublished manuscripts.

=== Bibliography ===
==== Collected volumes (posthumous) ====
- 1932. The Philosophy of the Present.
- 1934. Mind, Self, and Society.
- 1936. Movements of Thought in the Nineteenth Century.
- 1938. The Philosophy of the Act.
- 1964. Selected Writings. — This volume collects articles Mead himself prepared for publication.
- 1982. The Individual and the Social Self: Unpublished Essays by G. H. Mead.
- 2001. Essays in Social Psychology.
- 2010. G.H. Mead. A Reader.

==== Notable papers ====
- "Suggestions Towards a Theory of the Philosophical Disciplines" (1900);
- "Social Consciousness and the Consciousness of Meaning" (1910);
- "What Social Objects Must Psychology Presuppose" (1910);
- "The Mechanism of Social Consciousness" (1912);
- "The Social Self" (1913);
- "Scientific Method and the Individual Thinker"(1917);
- "A Behavioristic Account of the Significant Symbol" (1922);
- "The Genesis of Self and Social Control" (1925);
- "The Objective Reality of Perspectives" (1926);
- "The Nature of the Past" (1929); and
- "The Philosophies of Royce, James, and Dewey in Their American Setting" (1929).

== See also ==
- James Mark Baldwin
- Lev Vygotsky
- Chicago School (sociology)
