= Psychology of self and identity =

Subfield of psychology

The psychology of self and identity is a subfield of Psychology that moves psychological research "deeper inside the conscious mind of the person and further out into the person's social world." The exploration of self and identity subsequently enables the influence of both inner phenomenal experiences and the outer world in relation to the individual to be further investigated. This is particularly necessary following the topic's prevalence within the domain of social psychology.

Furthermore, research suggests that self and identity have significant impacts on well-being, behaviour, self-esteem and interpersonal relationships within a society and culture. Therefore, research into self and identity in humans is crucial to acknowledge, as few other species demonstrate behaviours relating to self-recognition and identity. The key areas involved in the investigation of self and identity include self-concept, self-esteem, and self-control.

What distinguishes the psychology of self and identity as a domain is its scientific character. Emphasis is placed on the empirical testing of systematic theories about relevant phenomena. Hence, its methodological approach differs from both philosophy and sociology.

The psychology of self and identity incorporates elements from different areas of psychology. However, it owes particularly large debt to personality psychology and social psychology.

== Self ==
The self refers to the reflective perspective from which a thing encounters itself, in particular, the hierarchical ordering of concepts born of self-reflection. The self includes the aspects of "thinking, being aware of thinking and talking to the self as an object for thinking" and is connected to motivators such as agency and communion. Furthermore, the self is manifested through both personal and social identities.

== Identity ==
Identity refers to a "tool by which individuals or groups categorize themselves and present themselves to the world." Thus, identities such as gender, race or age are used in the hierarchical organisation of concepts of self.

== Influence of culture on Self and Identity ==
Research suggests that an individual's perspective of self is predominately influenced by the culture they are socialised in, with culture referring to the level of cooperation, competition, or individualism a society emphasises. This suggests that self and identity are significantly dependent on whether the culture one associates with is individualist or collectivist, specifically due to the difference in normative rule and the structure of these societies. Collectivist cultures tend to be more interdependent societies, which is likely to result in "the individual (being) connected to significant others", thus creating fluidity of self and identity across time and contexts. This contrasts individualistic societies, where members perceive themselves as more independent and distinct from others. This research follows Tajfel and Turner's (1979) Social Identity Theory, which suggests that people derive a portion of their identity from the group they belong to. This is because individuals are more likely to adopt the identity of their ingroup, which results in the widespread adoption of norms, values, and behaviours.

This has been presented through cross-cultural – individualistic versus collectivist society – comparisons of the self-concept through the use of structured inventories, which demonstrated numerous cultural differences in self for self-statements and self-esteem statements. The participants in individualistic societies reported higher global self-esteem than those from collectivist cultures. Rosenberg (1965) defines self-esteem as an individual's overall positive evaluation of self, which has the capacity to change depending on an individual's outlook on life. The change in individual self-esteem, particularly in collectivist societies, is related to relationships with significant others, and it has the capacity to improve collective self-esteem by increasing the level of belonging.

== Influence of gender on Self and Identity ==
The cultural differences relating to self-esteem were also found to mirror those of gender differences. This was demonstrated by research that suggested women develop more of an interdependent self through the prioritisation of qualities that align them with others. This interdependence and, subsequently, higher levels of interpersonal communication among women have been demonstrated to increase their self-esteem. Men, on the other hand, often develop an independent self and identity. This results from men often being taught to "prioritise the qualities that distinguish and differentiate themselves from others," which leads to reduced self-esteem. The contrast within the self between men and women is further amplified through the presence of gender stereotypes within many societies.

== Influence of intergroup and outgroup relations ==
The treatment of minority groups by their own ingroup, and the way in which they treat and are treated by other groups has significant implications on self and identity. Negative treatment between groups can lead to adverse outcomes, while positive interactions can increase individual collective self-esteem. Therefore, positive interactions are critical in the formation of cross-group and cross-race friendships, as well as the positive relationships between intergroups. This was demonstrated by a study which suggested cross-group friendships provide "a sense of collective self-esteem among minority group members. In turn, collective self-esteem is likely to fuel collective action tendencies". High quality, positive relations among minority group members is necessary for the promoting of both collective self-esteem and well-being. The establishment of intergroup friendships is also necessary for the relationship self, which pertains to aspects of the self-concept that are rooted in interpersonal attachments that consist of shared aspects developed through relationships with significant others, such as family or friends. Conversely, the collective self pertains to aspects of self, derived from membership in social groups, such as ethnic groups or social classes. Therefore, these relationships shared from one person to the next can be described as one's self and identity.

== Self-knowledge ==
Self-knowledge has the capacity to influence self and identity due to the information that is stored or made available at a specific time, depending on the context of the situation. Within self-knowledge, there are two components: episodic self-knowledge and personal semantic memory. Episodic self-knowledge refers to the experiences one encounters over time, whereas personal semantic memory refers to "factual knowledge about the self". Both episodic and semantic self-knowledge contribute to the present self, as well as past and possible future selves. These forms of self-knowledge and, subsequently, self as a whole are impacted by social groups through their providing of context and meaning to inform emotion and behaviour. This causes individuals to assimilate to those in their in-group.

The extent to which self-knowledge is present changes throughout life. This is particularly the case with children, who have been demonstrated to not display all emotions presented in adults, such as empathy and embarrassment until their self-awareness is developed. Nevertheless, despite this malleability of self, self-knowledge is essential. This is because self-knowledge enables the formation of self and identity, as highlighted by research conducted on amnesic patients, which demonstrated that the preservation of semantic self-knowledge is essential for the maintenance of identity. This was discovered following patients suffering from Alzheimer's losing their identity once the disease caused the loss of personally relevant knowledge. This is likely to occur as individuals use knowledge about the world and themselves to construct their own identity.

== Analysis of the self: cultural and individual ==
There are levels of analysis that one can look at in terms of self and identity. The first level of analysis is the self on an individual level, for example; self-states, self-motives, self-esteem, self-efficacy. These self-states are self-process that include unbiased self-awareness. However, self-motives are more serious impulses to action, something that is innate and societal or cultural analysis of the self.

The second level of analysis is on the societal or cultural level, for example, the cultural conception of a person, cultural arrangements that make the person who they are and the cultural concept of self. This cultural analysis demonstrates the idea that the self is a social product created through social interactions within a cultural community. This occurs through the recognition of patterns of others' responses to behaviours in order to coordinate the self to the perceived social patterns of the in-group. Over time these generalised patterns of communication among group members create social norms and cause "each individual self (to be) a collaborative output of the entire cultural community". This further demonstrates the notion that self and identity are highly contingent upon culture.

== Key theories ==
=== Social Identity theory ===
One of the most influential theories relating to the formation of self and identity is Tajifel & Turner's (1979) Social identity theory. This psychological theory highlights the role that self-conception and behaviour has in group processes. The theory suggests that an individual's identity is formed and strengthened through the identification with their in-group. With in-group referring to the categorisation of individuals into a group based on correlated dimensions or values, such as that of ethnicity. The formation of in-groups and out-groups by individuals results in intergroups dynamics through the difference in social influence and norms across groups. This can lead to negative connotations and stereotyping of different out-groups.
