= Profession of Medicine =

1970 book by Eliot Freidson about Medical Sociology

Profession of Medicine: A Study of the Sociology of Applied knowledge
- Author: Eliot Freidson
- Language: English
- Genre: Nonfiction
- Published: 1970
- Publisher: New York University
- Publication place: United States of America

Profession of Medicine: A Study of the Sociology of Applied knowledge is a book by medical sociologist Eliot Freidson published in 1970. It received the Sorokin Award from the American Sociological Association for most outstanding contribution to scholarship and has been translated into four languages.

Peter Conrad argues that the book was the first book to apply sociological analysis to the profession and institution of medicine itself. The book contains many concepts that have affected our understanding of medicine including professional dominance, functional autonomy, clinical mentality, self-regulation, the social construction of illness, the connection between illness and deviance, illness as a social state. Bosks draws comparison of with the ideas in the book to Max Weber's analysis on the role of technical rationality and profession expertise on decision-making in a democratic society. Michael Calnon argues that the books sociological perspective is similar to that of structural pluralism where the medical profession is seen as a mediator between the state and the public, with the benefit of increased trust and reduced governmental costs.

== Synopsis ==
The book comprises four parts: the first explores the organization of the medical profession, the second explores the performance of day-to-day work, the third explores how the concept of illness functions socially, and the last explores what the role of technical expertise should be in a free society.

Freidson argues that the definition of profession is ill-defined and that people do not agree on which activities should be considered professions. He seeks to explore the sociological properties of the medical profession to understand what "profession" is.

=== Part I: Formal Organization of Medicine ===
In this first section, Freidson explores the history of medicine from a sociology perspective contrasting modern medicine with that the Greeks, Renaissance Medicine, and witch doctors in Africa. He distinguishes professions that help people solve problems, including lawyers and doctors, from those that pursue, such as academic scholars.

Freidson contrasts modern medicine to the Zande medicine of East Africa documented by E. E. Evans-Pritchard. In Zande medicine, the role of the doctor was to be a third party who established the causes of illness, as well as "leechcraft" that consisted of administering drugs, and the supposed removing "magical pellets" embedded in the body. The Zande people believed that witchcraft was an innate property of individuals passed hereditarily but potentially inactive. If an individual was found to be practicing witchcraft they could apologize, claim lack of intent and beg for their witchcraft to "cool". Zande witch-doctors were not very respected, Freidson hypothesizes this is because their divinations of the causes of ailments were not very effective. Freidson argues that in the past western medicine had a similar role to this witch doctoring.

Freidson argues that the study of the history of medicine does not give an accurate portrayal of the profession, since the study tends to only identify times at which medicine discovered things that are now considered true, rather than considering the ineffective treatments that were considered best practice in the past. Historians also fail to distinguish between the history of medical discover, and medical practice, noting that scientific discoveries did not necessarily form part of medical practice. He argues that medical practice in the past consisted of a number of conflicting theories for the cause of disease, where untrue theories such as the humoral medicine would sit beside more scientific viewpoints.

Freidson notes the 1860 discovery that anthrax was caused by a bacteria as a significant turning point in the practice of medicine, followed by a period where a theoretical model established a cause of a number of diseases. This allowed empirical treatments to be replaced by treatments based on the actual cause of the disease, or the prevention of the disease by the likes of Koch and Pasteur.

=== Part II: The organization of professional performance ===
Freidson explores medical workplaces in this section.

=== Part III: Social construction of disease ===
Freidson follows Luckmann and Berger's, The Social Construction of Reality, to consider how illness can function as a social rather than biological state. Illness is explored as a form of social deviance. Freidson looks at the construction of illness from a professional, lay, and societal perspective.

Freidson notes that the role of medicine had increased in American society taking over roles that had previously been filled by religious concepts. Citing Thomas Szasz, e argues that defining problems as medical problems rather than moral one's risks removing individuals rights to judge moral matters oneself drawing comparison to the individuals right to interpret scripture for themselves.

=== Part IV: Consulting Professions in a Free Society ===
Freidson argues that professions should have autonomy to make decisions that are technical, but they should not make decisions in areas where they do not have expertise, and that on moral or evaluative questions lay people should have as same involvement in decision making as experts.

Freidson distinguishes between codified expert knowledge and theories, which is stored in textbooks and publication, and the practice being an expert. This distinction is termed research versus practice. Freidson argues that since the practice of expertise happens in a social environment, the practice of knowledge is a social and socially biased activity.

Regarding the practice of knowledge, Freidson distinguishes four aspects of medicine: germ theory, the classification of disease, the analysis of prevention or reversing disease states, and the management of when the techniques of disease prevention are applied. Freidson notes that the use of medical technology, in the sense of diagnosis and treatment, has social meaning and so is a social activity.

Freidson thinks germ theory is an expert activity in which the layman is not involved. However, Freidson argues that the identification of disease is in part a moral activity. Drawing analogy to law, a doctor may be an expert in what is or is not a disease, but not whether the diagnosis and treatment is moral, since it is a moral question to decide whether a particular state is undesirable or not.
