= Eliot Freidson =

American sociologist (1923–2005)

- Born: 1923; Boston, Massachusetts, U.S.
- Died: December 14, 2005 (aged 81–82)
- Occupation: College Professor

Academic background
- Education: University of Chicago
- Influences: Everett Hughes

Academic work
- Discipline: Sociology
- Sub-discipline: Medical Sociology

Eliot Freidson (1923 – December 14, 2005) was an American medical sociologist who worked on the theory of professions. Charles Bosk says that Freidson was a founding figure in medical sociology who played a major role in the growth and legitimization of the subject. The American Sociological Society awards the Eliot Freidson Outstanding Publication Award for medical sociology every two years.

Freidson was born in Boston, received a doctorate in sociology from University of Chicago, and was a professor at New York University. He served in the US army in the 1940s.

Many of Freidsons original ideas on medicine were influenced by those of Everett Hughes, which Freidson took and turned into a consistent theory. Freidson's 1961 paper, Patients view of Medical Practice explores how patients and physicians have different conceptions of illness and how these conceptions create conflict between patients and doctors and critiques Talcott Parsons' concept of the sick role.

Freidson saw the doctor–patient relationship as a conflict or clash of perspectives. Calnan distinguishes this viewpoint from Talcott Parsons which focused more on the properties of expertise, ethics, and alturism of the profession.

Freidson developed the professional dominance perspective. Freidson argued that medicine had achieved autonomy from other professions, noting that within the healthcare field the division of labor with other professions is determined by medicine itself. Freidson argues that this autonomy can lead to a false sense of objectivity and certainty within the medical profession.

== Publications ==
=== Papers ===
- Patients view of Medical Practice, 1961
- Professionalism and the Organization of Middle-Class Labour in Postindustrial Society, 1973
- Professions and the Occupational Principle, 1973

=== Books ===
- Profession of Medicine: A Study of the Sociology of Applied Knowledge, 1970
- Doctoring Together: A Study of Professional Control, 1975
- Professionalism: The Third Logic, 2001
- Professional Dominance: The Social Structure of Medical Care, 2006

Profession of medicine won the Sorokin Award from the American Sociological Association for most outstanding contribution to scholarship.Peter Conrad argues that the book was the first book to apply sociological analysis to the profession and institution of medicine itself and contains many concepts that have affected understanding of medicine including professional dominance, functional autonomy, clinical mentality, self-regulation, the social construction of illness. He was elected to the Institute of Medicine at the National Academy of Sciences in 1972.
