= Christopher Gillberg =

Swedish psychiatrist (born 1950)

- Born: Lars Christopher Gillberg; 19 April 1950 (age 76); Gothenburg, Sweden
- Occupation: Professor
- Known for: Autism research; Research controversy regarding the Gothenburg Study of Children with DAMP; Deficits in attention, motor control and perception

Lars Christopher Gillberg (born 19 April 1950) is a professor of Child and Adolescent Psychiatry at the University of Gothenburg in Gothenburg, Sweden. He has been a visiting professor at the universities of Bergen, New York, Odense, St George's (University of London), San Francisco, Glasgow, and Strathclyde. Gillberg is the founding editor of the journal European Child & Adolescent Psychiatry.

== Autism research ==
In the early 1980s, the concept of the 'autism spectrum' was introduced by Lorna Wing and Gillberg. Gillberg has conducted extensive research on autism throughout his academic career. In 2003, a French and Swedish research team at the Institut Pasteur, and the psychiatry departments at University of Gothenburg and the University of Paris, led by Thomas Bourgeron, Marion Leboyer, and Gillberg, discovered the first precisely identified genetic mutations in individuals with autism. The team identified mutations altering two genes on the X chromosome, which appear to play a role in the formation of synapses (communication spaces between neurons), in two families where multiple members were diagnosed with autism. Earlier studies, such as the Paris Autism Research International Sib-Pair Study (PARIS), coordinated by Gillberg and Marion Leboyer, have more generally associated the X-chromosome regions with autism. The 2003 findings indicated the location of the mutation to be on the NLGN4 gene and the NGLN3 gene. The mutation prevents a complete protein from forming, and is inherited from the mother.

Since 2006, Gillberg has participated in a cross-disciplinary project titled "Autism spectrum conditions: the Gothenburg collaborative studies", funded by the Swedish Research Council (Vetenskapsrådet). The project is a collaboration between scientists specialized in child and youth psychiatry, molecular biology, and neuroscience, and involves a genetic part with an international study team of French, British, and U.S. researchers examining various aspects of autism. Some of the results were published in 2007. The project also includes a genetic study on the Faroe Islands.

== DAMP, MBD, and ADHD ==
In the 1970s, Gillberg and colleagues introduced the concept Deficits in Attention, Motor Control and Perception (DAMP), primarily used in Scandinavia. The DAMP concept as used in more recent publications, refers to Attention-deficit hyperactivity disorder (ADHD) in combination with Developmental Coordination Disorder (DCD). According to Gillberg, it constitutes a "subgroup of the diagnostic category of ADHD, conceptually similar – but not clinically identical – to the WHO concept of HKD (hyperkinetic disorder)", and is diagnosed on the basis of "concomitant attention deficit/hyperactivity disorder and developmental coordination disorder in children who do not have severe learning disability or cerebral palsy".

Some scholars disagree with the lumping of ADHD and DCD, arguing that they are unrelated. In 2003, Gillberg noted that, although there could be "an issue of how to deal with the conflict between splitting (ADHD plus DCD) and lumping (DAMP)", he maintained that "the DAMP construct has helped identify a group of children with ADHD and multiple needs that will not be self-evident if the diagnosis is just ADHD or just DCD." Before the Scandinavian studies, recognition that individuals with attention problems may also have difficulties with movement, perception, and memory had received little attention in studies. According to various studies, half of the children with ADHD also have DCD.

With the development of the ADHD concept, the previous, less precise, category of Minimal Brain Dysfunction (MBD), "a term almost universally employed in child psychiatry and developmental pediatrics from the 1950s to the early 1980s" was replaced. Gillberg began to study DAMP in the late 1970s, when ADHD was still called MBD, and the DAMP concept has been adjusted as the term ADHD was introduced and became internationally used. Around 1990, DAMP had become a generally accepted diagnostic concept in two Nordic countries, but when the DSM-IV appeared in 1994, DAMP became considered a redundant term in many countries, since DAMP is essentially equivalent to ADHD in combination with DCD, as defined by DSM-IV. Gillberg's four criteria for DAMP are:

- ADHD as defined in DSM-IV
- Developmental coordination disorder as defined in DSM-IV
- Condition not better accounted for by cerebral palsy
- IQ higher than about 50 [Gillberg, 2003: box1]

According to Gillberg, clinically severe form of DAMP (or ADHD + DCD) affects roughly 1.5% of the general population of school age children; another few per cent are affected by more moderate variants. Boys are overrepresented; girls are currently probably underdiagnosed. There are many overlapping conditions, including conduct disorder, depression/anxiety, and academic failure. There is a strong link with autism spectrum disorders in severe DAMP. Familial factors, and pre- and perinatal risk factors, account for much of the variance. Psychosocial risk factors appear to increase the risk of marked psychiatric abnormality in DAMP. Outcome in early adult age was psychosocially poor in one study in almost 60% of unmedicated cases. About half of all cases with ADHD have DCD, and conversely, ADHD occurs in about half of all cases of DCD.

As of December 2024, Gillberg has authored 780 papers (listed at PubMed) on DAMP, ADHD and related conditions.

== Gillberg's criteria for Asperger syndrome ==
In 1989, Gillberg created one of the first diagnostic criteria for Asperger syndrome, which was revised in 1991. They are applied in clinical practice due to the adhesion to the original description of Hans Asperger. All of the following six criteria must be met for confirmation of diagnosis:

1. Severe impairment in reciprocal social interaction (at least two of the following)
  1. Inability to interact with peers
  2. Lack of desire to interact with peers
  3. Lack of appreciation of social cues
  4. Socially and emotionally inappropriate behavior
2. All-absorbing narrow interest (at least one of the following)
  1. Exclusion of other activities
  2. Repetitive adherence
  3. More rote than meaning
3. Imposition of routines and interests (at least one of the following)
  1. On self, in aspects of life
  2. On others
4. Speech and language problems (at least three of the following)
  1. Delayed development
  2. Superficially perfect expressive language
  3. Formal, pedantic language
  4. Odd prosody, peculiar voice characteristics
  5. Impairment of comprehension including misinterpretations of literal/implied meanings
5. Non-verbal communication problems (at least one of the following)
  1. Limited use of gestures
  2. Clumsy/gauche body language
  3. Limited facial expression
  4. Inappropriate expression
  5. Peculiar, stiff gaze
6. Motor clumsiness: poor performance on neurodevelopmental examination

Gillberg's criteria differ from those given in the DSM-IV-TR. Some scholars have therefore criticized them for "making it difficult to compare with other studies." It has been argued that the failure of some research groups to replicate some of Gillberg's findings "may relate primarily to fundamental differences in diagnostic approach".

== Awards ==
Gillberg has received several awards for his research, including:

- Minor Fernström prize,1991
- Ingvar Award, 1995
- The Ronald McDonald Major Award for Paediatrics, 1998
- Ågrenska Major Medicine Prize, 2001
- Honorary professorship at the UCL Institute of Child Health, University College London in 2008.
- The King's Medal of the Seraphim order, 2009
- Dahlberg award, 2010.
- The Söderberg Prize for Medicine, 2012
- In 2010, the Gillberg Neuropsychiatry Centre, named after Gillberg, within the Institute of Neuroscience and Physiology, Sahlgrenska Academy, University of Gothenburg, was founded.
- 2016 INSAR Lifetime Achievement Award at the International Meeting for Autism Research
- Arvid Carlsson Foundation Major Prize (2024)
- The Hilda och Alfred Eriksson Prize from the Royal Academy of Science in Sweden (2024)

== See also ==
- Gothenburg Study of Children with DAMP
- Rapid-onset gender dysphoria controversy

== Notes ==
- Wärngård M. (17 March 2006), "Villkorligt och böter för Gillbergmedarbetare." Dagens Medicin. [In Swedish.]
- White, Caroline (10 July 2004), "Destruction of data prompts calls for Swedish agency to investigate research misconduct." British Medical Journal, 329: 72.
- White C (July 2005). "Swedish court rules against doctor at centre of row over destroyed research data". BMJ. 331 (7510): 180. doi:10.1136/bmj.331.7510.180-f. PMC 1179809. PMID 16037439.

== Selected publications by Gillberg ==
=== Journal articles ===
- Steffenburg, Suzanne; Gillberg Christopher; Hellgren Lars; et al. (May 1989). "A Twin Study of Autism in Denmark, Finland, Iceland, Norway and Sweden". Journal of Child Psychology and Psychiatry, and Allied Disciplines. 30 (3). The Association for Child Psychology and Psychiatry: 405–416. doi:10.1111/j.1469-7610.1989.tb00254.x. ISSN 0021-9630. PMID 2745591.
- Baron-Cohen, Simon; Jane Allen; Christopher Gillberg (December 1992). "Can Autism Be. Detected at 18 Months? The Needle, the Haystack and the CHAT". The British Journal of Psychiatry. 161 (6). The Royal College of Psychiatrists: 839–43. doi:10.1192/bjp.161.6.839. ISSN 0007-1250. PMID 1483172. S2CID 196176.
- Ehlers S, Gillberg C (1993). "The epidemiology of Asperger's syndrome. A total population study". J Child Psychol Psychiatry. 34 (8): 1327–50. doi:10.1111/j.1469-7610.1993.tb02094.x. PMID 8294522.
- Happe, Francesca; Ehlers Stefan; Fletcher Paul; et al. (20 December 1996). "'Theory of mind' in the brain. Evidence from a PET scan study of Asperger syndrome". NeuroReport. 8 (1). Rapid Science Publishers: 197–201. doi:10.1097/00001756-199612200-00040. hdl:21.11116/0000-0001-A166-6. ISSN 0959-4965. PMID 9051780. S2CID 2970614.
- Philippe, Anne; Martinez Maria; Guilloud-Bataille Michel; et al. (May 1999). "Genome-wide scan for autism susceptibility genes". Human Molecular Genetics. 8 (5). Oxford University Press: 805–812. doi:10.1093/hmg/8.5.805. ISSN 1460-2083. PMID 10196369.
- Jamain, Stéphane; Quach Hélène; Betancur Catalina; et al. (31 March 2003). "Mutations of the X-linked genes encoding neuroligins NLGN3 and NLGN4 are associated with autism". Nature Genetics. 34 (1). Nature Publishing Group: 27–29. doi:10.1038/ng1136. ISSN 1061-4036. PMC 1925054. PMID 12669065.
- Ståhlberg, Ola; Söderström Henrik; Råstam, Maria; et al. (July 2004). "Bipolar disorder, schizophrenia, and other psychotic disorders in adults with childhood onset AD/HD and/or autism spectrum disorders". Journal of Neural Transmission. 111 (7). Springer Wien: 891–902. doi:10.1007/s00702-004-0115-1. ISSN 0300-9564. PMID 15206005. S2CID 7824831.
- Miller, Marilyn T.; Strömland, Kerstin; Ventura Liana; et al. (April–May 2005). "Autism associated with conditions characterized by developmental errors in early embryogenesis: a mini review". International Journal of Developmental Neuroscience. 23 (2–3). Elsevier: 201–219. doi:10.1016/j.ijdevneu.2004.06.007. ISSN 0736-5748. PMID 15749246. S2CID 14248227.

=== Selected books ===
- Gillberg, Christopher (1981). Neuropsychiatric aspects of perceptual, motor and attentional deficits in seven-year-old Swedish children. Uppsala: Uppsala University. ISBN 978-91-554-1212-8.
- Coleman, Mary; Gillberg, Christopher (1985). The biology of the autistic syndromes. New York: Praeger. ISBN 978-0-03-000834-4.
- Gillberg, Christopher, ed. (1989). Diagnosis and treatment of autism. New York: Plenum Press. ISBN 978-0-306-43481-5.
- Gillberg, Christopher (1995). Clinical Child Neuropsychiatry. Cambridge University Press. ISBN 978-0-521-54335-4.
- Gillberg, Christopher (1997). Barn, Ungdomar och vuxna med Asperger Syndrom – Normala, geniala, nördar? (in Swedish). Gothenburg: Bokförlaget Cura AB. ISBN 978-91-972641-6-7.
- Gillberg, Christopher; Peeters, Theo (1998). Autism : medical and educational aspects. London: Whurr. ISBN 978-0-521-54335-4.
- Gillberg, Christopher (2002). A Guide to Asperger Syndrome. Cambridge University Press. ISBN 978-0-521-00183-0.
- Gillberg, Christopher; Harrington, Richard; Steinhausen, Hans-Christoph (2006). A clinician's handbook of child and adolescent psychiatry. Cambridge: Cambridge University Press. ISBN 978-0-521-81936-7.
- Coleman M, Gillberg C, The Autisms, Oxford University Press, 2012
- Gillberg C, ADHD and its many associated problems, Oxford University Press, 2014
- Gillberg C, Råstam M, Fernell E (red.) Barn och Ungdomspsykiatri, Natur & Kultur, 2015
- Gillberg C, ESSENCE Om ADHD, autism och andra utvecklingsavvikelser , Natur & Kultur, 2018
