= Margot Jefferys =

British sociologist and professor

Margot Jefferys (Margaret, née Davies; 1 November 1916 – 3 March 1999) was Professor of Medical Sociology at Bedford College, London, from 1968 to 1982. She also lectured at the London School of Hygiene and Tropical Medicine. She is considered a pioneer of medical sociology.

== Early life and education ==
Margot Jefferys, also known as Margaret, was born in 1916 in Madras, India, where her father was the principal of a law college. She was the third of four children. The family returned to England when Jefferys was seven, and she was educated at Berkhamsted School for Girls. She attended the London School of Economics from 1935 to 1938, where she earned a Bachelor of Arts with honours in history.

== Career ==
Jefferys married James Jefferys in 1941, and the couple moved to the US when he was offered a scholarship to attend Harvard. They returned to the UK at the outbreak of the Second World War, and Jefferys worked as the manager of the Communist Party bookshop in Coventry.

Moving to London in 1944, Jefferys taught part-time at the Workers’ Educational Association, and began working as a research assistant at Bedford College in 1949. In 1953, she was appointed as a postgraduate lecturer at the London School of Hygiene and Tropical Medicine, which marked the beginning of her career in medical sociology. She came to be considered a pioneer in the field.

From 1965, Jefferys was director of Bedford College's Social Research Unit, and she was awarded a personal chair as Professor of Medical Sociology at Bedford College, London, from 1968 to 1982. She edited an essay collection on ageing Growing Old In The Twentieth Century, and published her first book in 1954 (Mobility and the Labour Market), which was followed by An Anatomy of Social Welfare (1965), and Rethinking General Practice: Dilemmas in Primary Medical Care (1983).

Jefferys co-authored Life After Ninety with Mike Bury, based on their work from the Life After Ninety survey.

Jefferys was made a Fellow of the Royal College of Physicians in 1984 and an honorary fellow of the Royal College of General Practitioners in 1988.

Jefferys died of pancreatic cancer on 3 March 1999 at her home in London, at the age of 82. She had three children, and divorced from her husband in 1959.
