= Gillberg =

Gillberg may refer to:

- Carina Gillberg or Christopher Gillberg, who published a set of diagnostic criteria for Asperger's Syndrome (known) as Gillberg and Gillberg
- Gillberg (wrestler), American professional wrestler
- the Gillberg Hundred, a historical administrative subdivision
