= Hyperkinesis =

Hyperkinesis may refer to:

- Hyperkinesia, abnormally heightened, sometimes uncontrollable muscle movement
- Hyperactivity, abnormally heightened activity
- Hyperkinetic disorder, an early childhood-onset disorder characterized by hyperactivity, impulsivity and inattention, similar to attention deficit hyperactivity disorder
