= Gilles Bloch =

French researcher and neuroscientist

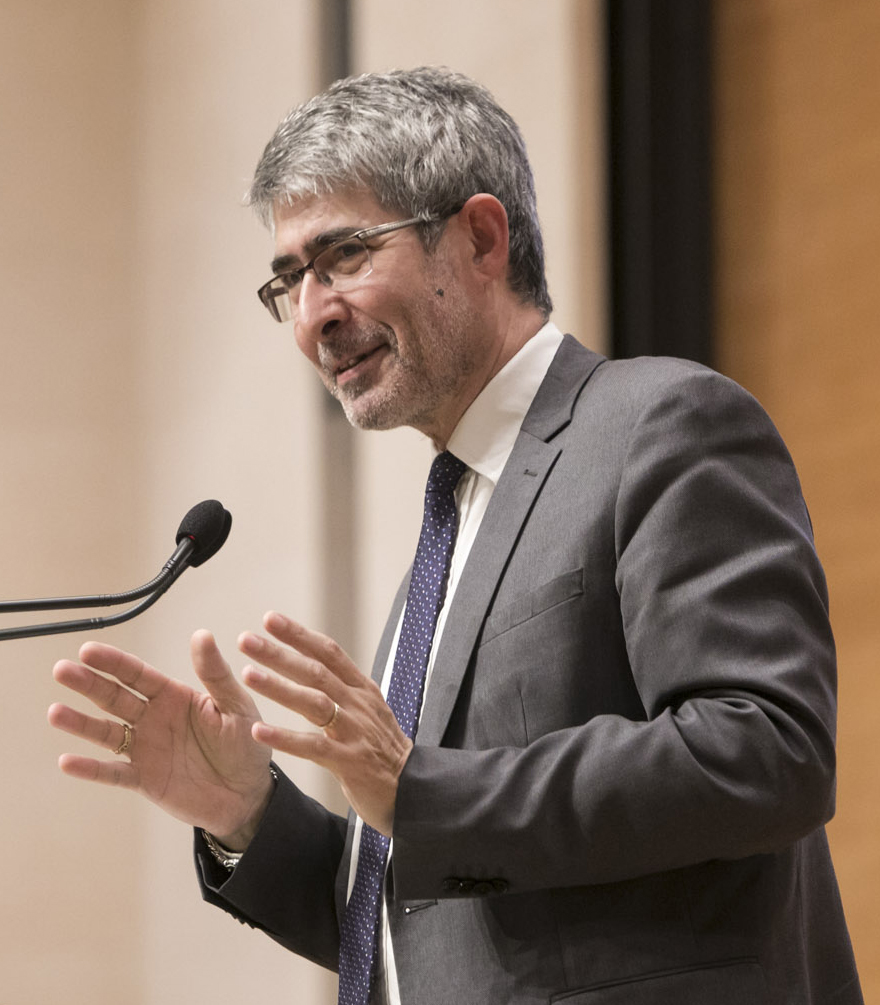

President of the National Museum of Natural History, France
- Incumbent
- Assumed office 1 September 2023
- Preceded by: Bruno David

President of Paris-Saclay University
- In office 2015–2018
- Preceded by: Dominique Vernay
- Succeeded by: Sylvie Retailleau

Personal details
- Born: 19 July 1961 (age 65) Pointe-à-Pitre, Guadeloupe
- Education: École polytechnique Pierre and Marie Curie University; Paris Diderot University

Gilles Bloch (born 19 July 1961) is a French polytechnicien, doctor of medicine and researcher in molecular biophysics, specializing in muscle and brain metabolism. He was director general of research and innovation from 2006 to 2009, then president of Paris-Saclay University between 2015 and 2018, and president of Inserm between 2019 and 2023. Since September 2023, he has served as President of the National Museum of Natural History, France.

== Biography ==
Gilles Bloch was born in Pointe-à-Pitre, Guadeloupe on July 19, 1961.

=== Studies ===
He entered the École polytechnique in 1981, and then studied biophysics and medicine: he obtained a PhD in molecular biophysics in 1989 from the Pierre-et-Marie-Curie University, and a PhD in medicine in 1991 from the Paris-Diderot University.

He also holds a Habilitation to Supervise Research.

== Professional career ==
In 1989, he joined the in vivo NMR spectroscopy laboratory of the Service hospitalier Frédéric-Joliot (SHFJ) within the CEA biology department. He participated in the development of the very first in vivo nuclear medicine elements. He worked there until 1997 and became a specialist in muscle and brain metabolism. During this period, his post-doctorate took him to Yale University, in the laboratory of Robert G. Shulman, one of the pillars of nuclear magnetic resonance.

In 1997, he was appointed head of the laboratory at the Frédéric-Joliot Hospital in Orsay (1997-2000), then head of the "nuclear medicine and functional imaging" segment; he was appointed deputy director of the CEA's Life Sciences Directorate in 2001.

He left the CEA in June 2002 to join the cabinet of Claudie Haigneré, who had just been appointed Minister for Research and New Technologies. In April 2004, when Haigneré left the government, Gilles Bloch became deputy director of the cabinet of François d'Aubert, the new minister in charge of Research.

During the debates preceding the vote on Law No. 2004-800 of August 6, 2004, on bioethics, he declared

"There is no question of France importing cells that would have been produced under unethical conditions. The law specifies that these cells must have been obtained in compliance with the fundamental principles set out in the civil code: free consent, free of charge, inviolability of the body, and anonymity. They may not come from an embryo created for research purposes, a possibility that remains prohibited by law.

In February 2005, François d'Aubert chose Gilles Bloch as the first director of the new National Research Agency (ANR), whose purpose is to fund public research and "partnership" research in France. Presenting an initial assessment after nine months, Gilles Bloch is pleased with the smooth running of the agency. Gilles Bloch acknowledged "youthful errors" in an assessment that was called into question by the publication of the report La recherche sans qualités: un audit indépendant de l'Agence nationale de la recherche by Marc Flandreau.

In May 2006, he was appointed Director General of Research and Innovation at the Ministry of Research. Gilles Bloch is thus an important player in the organization of research in France, an organization based on:

- orientation: definition of major national policies (creation of the Strategy Directorate, the High Council for Science and Technology)
- programming: translating objectives into research programs (creation of agencies that have since been merged into Oséo)
- implementation: creation of tools available to operators, in particular to help create world-class leaders, build local strategies and strengthen partnerships with companies.

In 2007, Valérie Pécresse, the new Minister of Research, confirmed Gilles Bloch as Director General of Research and Innovation. He entrusted Jean-Pierre Alix with a mission on scientific integrity, which led to a report in September 2010. On September 1, 2009, a press release from the Ministry indicated that he was leaving his position at his own request. He was then appointed head of the Life Sciences Directorate, one of the five directorates of the French Alternative Energies and Atomic Energy Commission.

He is particularly active in promoting the integration of young PhDs into the business world.

Gilles Bloch chaired the scientific interest group "Infrastructures in biology, health and agronomy" created in May 2007 and the Conference of University Presidents (CPU), and the two directorates DGRI and DGES of the Ministry of Higher Education and Research. He is vice-president of the FondaMental Foundation founded by Valérie Pécresse, a scientific cooperation foundation dedicated to mental illness, which he chaired in 2011.

On June 10, 2015, Gilles Bloch was elected President of the University of Paris-Saclay by the Board of Directors of the ComUE, succeeding Dominique Vernay who had held this position since January 2015. At the same time, he became President of the Paris-Saclay Scientific Cooperation Foundation, which coordinates the campus operation and the Idex project.

On November 26, 2018, Gilles Bloch was appointed President of Inserm. He took office on January 2, 2019. On January 13, 2023, French President Emmanuel Macron chose Professor Didier Samuel, Dean of the Faculty of Medicine at Paris-Saclay, to succeed him as President of Inserm.

In September 2023, Gilles Bloch became President of the National Museum of Natural History, France, succeeding Bruno David.
