= Deficits in attention, motor control and perception =

Proposed psychiatric diagnosis

DAMP (deficits in attention, motor control, and perception) is a psychiatric concept conceived by Christopher Gillberg and defined by the presence of five properties: problems of attention, gross and fine motor skills, perceptual deficits, and speech–language impairments. While routinely diagnosed in Scandinavian countries, the diagnosis has been rejected in the rest of the world. Minor cases of DAMP are roughly defined as a combination of developmental coordination disorder (DCD) and a pervading attention deficit.

DAMP is similar to minimal brain dysfunction (MBD), a concept that was formulated in the 1960s, and which has since been recognised as attention deficit hyperactivity disorder. Both concepts are related to certain psychiatric conditions, such as hyperactivity. The concept of MBD was strongly criticised by Michael Rutter and several other researchers, and this led to its abandonment in the 1980s. At the same time, research showed that something similar was needed. One alternative concept was attention-deficit hyperactivity disorder (ADHD). Gillberg proposed another alternative: DAMP, which was formulated in the early 1980s; the term itself was introduced in a paper that Gillberg and others published in 1986. DAMP is essentially MBD without the etiological assumptions.

The concept of DAMP was met with considerable criticism. For example, Sir Michael Rutter stated that the concept of DAMP (unlike ADHD) was "muddled" and lacked "both internal coherence and external discriminative validity […] it has no demonstrated treatment or prognostic implications", thence concluding that the concept should be abandoned. Another example is the criticism of Per-Anders Rydelius, professor of child psychiatry at the Karolinska Institute, who argued that the definition of DAMP is too vague and the difference between DAMP and conduct disorders or ADHD is unclear; he concluded that the concept needs to be reviewed. In 2000, Eva Kärfve, a sociologist at the University of Lund, published a book that advocated for total academic rejection of Gillberg's work on DAMP.

Perhaps the strongest criticism of DAMP is that Gillberg and his coworkers in Gothenburg are virtually the only people in the world to be researching DAMP. Indeed, in a review of DAMP published by Gillberg in 2003, it was noted that there were only about 50 research papers that had been published on DAMP and that the vast majority of these have either originated in the author's own clinical and research setting or have been supervised and/or co-authored by him. This is in contrast to ADHD, on which "several thousand papers" had been published. As far as clinical practice goes, DAMP has been primarily accepted only in Gillberg's homeland of Sweden and in neighboring Denmark, although, even in those countries, acceptance is mixed.

In 2003, Gillberg revised the concept of DAMP, redefining it anew as follows:

1. ADHD as defined in DSM-IV;
2. developmental coordination disorder (DCD) as defined in DSM-IV;
3. condition not better accounted for by cerebral palsy; and
4. IQ should be higher than about 50. (In the WHO system, this would be a hyperkinetic disorder combined with a developmental disorder of motor function.) About half of children with ADHD are believed to also have DCD.

Strong criticism of DAMP, however, has continued. In particular, it has been observed that "the validity and utility of DAMP will remain unclear until stronger evidence of the special status of the overlap between its constituent disorders is provided".

In 2005, there was an hour-long television programme broadcast on Swedish TV, questioning why Sweden, almost alone in the world, would accept the DAMP construct. The programme featured critical commentary from Sir Michael Rutter. It also considered some of the controversies over Gillberg's Gothenburg Study of Children with DAMP.

== Clinical use ==
Clinicians distinguish between severe presentations (characterised by pervasive impairments) and moderate variants involving attention deficits alongside narrower motor or perceptual difficulties. Population screenings of Scandinavian children at school entry (ages 6 to 7) indicate that severe DAMP affects roughly 1–2% of children, and moderate forms affect an additional 3% to 6%, with motor coordination deficits present in approximately half of all children diagnosed with ADHD. Boys are diagnosed three to five times as often as girls, though clinical studies suggest females are frequently underdiagnosed.

Etiological research indicates that hereditary factors and pre-/perinatal complications account for most of the variance in DAMP, while adverse psychosocial environments heighten the risk of severe psychiatric morbidity. Affected children exhibit higher rates of academic difficulties and psychiatric comorbidity than peers with ADHD or DCD alone. Longitudinal cohort studies tracking unmedicated individuals from childhood into their twenties and thirties show that, although overt hyperactivity and gross motor clumsiness often become less noticeable during adolescence, inattention and functional impairments typically persist. In one controlled community follow-up at age 22, nearly three-fifths of unmedicated participants experienced poor psychosocial outcomes—including lower educational attainment, occupational disability, substance misuse, criminal offences, or personality and psychiatric disorders—compared to a small minority of control groups. Consequently, clinical management emphasises early, multimodal intervention combining psychoeducation from family and teachers, as well as classroom accommodations, targeted physical or occupational therapy for motor impairments, and central stimulant medication.
