= Marion Leboyer =

French psychiatrist

- Born: 1957 (age 68–69)
- Occupations: Psychiatrist, university professor, hospital practitioner in Paris
- Known for: Mental health, autism, bipolar disorder, schizophrenia and depression research, COVID-19 pandemic

Marion Leboyer (born 1957) is a French psychiatrist, university professor and hospital practitioner at the Paris-Est Créteil University (UPEC).

== Biography ==
After completing her medical studies at Paris Descartes University, a master's degree and a PhD in science at Pierre and Marie Curie University in Paris, and being appointed intern at the Paris hospitals in 1981, she was head of clinic at La Pitié-Salpêtrière Hospital from 1989 to 1994. From 2002 to 2007, she was head of the sectorized psychiatry department at Albert Chenevier Hospital and of the psychiatry department at Henri Mondor Hospital in 2002 before being appointed head of the psychiatry division there. Since 2019, she is the medical director of the university hospital department Innovation en santé Mentale, Psychiatrie et AddiCTologie du Grand-Paris-Sud (DMU IMPACT) within Centre hospitalier universitaire Henri-Mondor (AP-HP) and of the Fédération hospitalo-universitaire de médecine de précision en psychiatrie et addictologie (FHU ADAPT) since 2020.

Her research focuses on bipolar disorder, schizophrenia and autism. She joined Institut national de la santé et de la recherche médicale (Inserm) in 1986, which allowed her to do her PhD thesis, defended in 1990, on the genetics of manic-depressive illness in the laboratory of Josué Feingold. In 2007, she became director of the Laboratoire de Psychiatrie Génétique, a laboratory renamed "Laboratoire de Neuro-Psychiatrie Translationnelle" in 2019, within Institut Mondor de Recherche Biomédicale in Créteil.

Since 2007, and in addition to her responsibilities as a university professor and hospital practitioner, Prof. Leboyer has directed the FondaMental foundation, a French foundation for scientific cooperation in mental health, created in July 2007 by the ministries in charge of research and health, following a call for tenders from the RTRS (Réseau Thématique de Recherche et de Soins), with the objective of innovation in the organization of care, support for research, training and information on mental illness.

She was a member of the Haut Conseil de la science et de la technologie from 2010 to 2013.

In December 2021, Prof. Leboyer received the Inserm Grand Prix for the innovative character of her research work, especially on bipolar disorders, schizophrenia and autism spectrum disorders. This award pays tribute to a French scientific researcher whose work has led to remarkable progress in the knowledge of human physiology, in therapeutics, and more broadly, in the field of health. It is one of the highest French scientific distinctions.

Marion Leboyer is a member of the Executive Committee of the European College of Neuropsychopharmacology (ECNP) for the term 2022-2025, serving as a Councillor.

Marion Leboyer is the scientific director of the precision psychiatry project program (PEPR PROXY), selected under the France 2030 national investment plan of the French government. France 2030 is a national investment program aimed at supporting research and innovation in areas including healthcare, technology and sustainability. According to Clarivate, Marion Leboyer is among the most cited authors in her field, and she has an h-index of 141 according to Google Scholar.

== Awards and recognition ==
- 2002: Inserm Prize for Public Health Research
- 2006: knight (chevalier) of the Legion of Honour
- 2007: Jean Bernard Research Award of Fondation pour la recherche médicale
- 2011: Mogens Schou Award of the International Society for Bipolar Disorders
- 2018: Edgar Faure Prize for her book Psychiatrie : L'Etat d'urgence
- 2018 : ECNP Neuropsychopharmacology Award
- 2018 : Philippe and Maria Halphen Award of the Académie des Sciences
- 2021: Inserm Grand Prix
- 2021: Officer (officier) of the Legion of Honour

== Publications and scientific contributions ==
Since 1984, Prof. Leboyer has collaborated on more than 950 international articles and journal articles with an h-index of 97 (number of citations: 37,994) as well as on several books including Psychiatrie, état d'urgence published by Fayard in 2018 (Political Book of the Year Award). She is one of the most cited researchers at the international level and is notably among the "Highly cited researchers" of the Clarivates analytics ranking for the fourth consecutive year (since 20218).

On the scientific level, she contributed to the discovery of one of the first genetic mutations in autism, with Stéphane Jamain and Thomas Bourgeron.

She has also published numerous studies showing the association of bipolar disorders with genetic variants of genes involved in the synthesis of monoamines (serotonin, dopamine in particular), but also of clock genes, or more recently of genes involved in the immune response against inflammation.

On the immunological level, she contributed with Ryad Tamouza to the launching of the immuno-psychiatry field, the synthesis of which was published in 2021 in the book Immuno-Psychiatry: facts and prospects. The results of research in immuno-psychiatry have been summarized in review articles.

In particular, she has shown that patients with bipolar disorders have a particular immunogenetic terrain, predisposing them to a poorer anti-infectious response, explaining the persistence of inflammatory responses.

She has also shown the presence in bipolar and schizophrenic patients of human endogenous retrovirus activation (HERV-W) in psychotic and bipolar disorders.

She is at the origin, in collaboration with Laurent Groc, of the autoimmune psychosis concept.

She contributed with Josselin Houenou to the description of the neuroanatomical bases of psychiatric diseases, such as the abnormalities of the cortico-limbic loops underlying the abnormalities of emotion regulation in bipolar disorder or the abnormalities of the cerebellum in schizophrenia. She also participated in the description of connectivity anomalies associated with the most severe psychiatric pathologies or the increase of dendritic density in bipolar patients taking lithium.

She has also taken part in numerous epidemiological studies, such as, for example, the demonstration of an increased risk of schizophrenia linked to urbanization, to childhood trauma, to infections.

She has been involved in research on genetic and environmental vulnerability factors in mental illnesses (in particular in bipolar disorders) and autism, in the identification of immuno-inflammatory phenomena in different psychiatric pathologies, in the identification of abnormalities of different circuits in brain imaging and in the realization of different clinical trials, in particular with oxytocin in autism, published in the PNAS journal.

Due to the monitoring of cohorts from the Expert Centers for patients with bipolar disorder or schizophrenia of the FondaMental foundation, she has highlighted the importance of medical comorbidities associated with psychiatric illnesses, which are the first cause of mortality in psychiatric disorders and the reason for the loss of 20 years of life expectancy.

With Prof. Isabelle Durand-Zaleski, health economist, she contributed to quantifying the cost of mental health (160 billion euros/year of direct and indirect expenditure in 2018).

She also highlighted the very low funding of research in psychiatry in France (2% of the total biomedical research budget).

She demonstrated the cost associated with each pathology, for example, schizophrenia (15,000 euros per year).

Within the framework of the European FP7 project "ROAMER", she contributed to the drafting of the roadmap for research in European Psychiatry.

== Recent books ==
- Psychiatrie - état d'urgence, M. Leboyer and P.-M. LLorca, Fayard, 2018.
- Immuno-psychiatry: facts and prospects, M. Berk, M. Leboyer, I. Sommers, Springer Nature Publications, 2021.
- Réinventer la santé mentale avec la Covid-19, M. Leboyer, A. de Danne, L. Letessier, Odile Jacob, 2021.

== Position statements ==
She believes that French psychiatry is not specialized enough, and would like to see the development of specialized units. In this respect, she has contributed to the creation of several national networks of expert centers, specialized multidisciplinary structures, care and research platforms in the field of bipolar disorders, schizophrenia, resistant depression, and high functioning autism. As a partner in numerous research projects on the economic impact of mental illnesses, she has helped to show that these mental illnesses have a significant economic impact (109 billion euros per year in France) mainly due to indirect costs, whereas investment in research is too low in France (2% of the biomedical research budget, compared to 7% in the United Kingdom and 11% in the United States). Larger investments could reduce the societal and economic impact of these illnesses, and improve their prognosis.

The page dedicated to the InFor-autism project, on the FondaMental foundation website, defines "Autism Spectrum Disorders" as a "disease" and proposes a "two-year cohort monitoring of patients, healthy subjects and relatives (parents, brothers or sisters of the patients included in the study)" in order to "study and distinguish the clinical and cognitive profiles of the patients, to search for biomarkers (clinical, neuro-anatomical, immunological, biochemical etc.) stable over time and identify genetic factors involved in autism". On May 23, 2018, a video by Prof. Leboyer on YouTube unveiled the InFoR-autism project in partnership with Inserm and the Roche Institute. In it, Marion Leboyer states the project to seek a "curative treatment" for autism. This position seems to diverge from the movement to recognize Autism Spectrum Disorders as a set of disabilities (and not as a pathology), as defined in particular by the French Law for equal rights and opportunities, participation and citizenship of disabled people (February 11, 2005), commented on by the association Autisme France in a document from February 2015 highlighting the current difficulty for MDPHs to recognize autism other than as a psychological disorder, due to the "omnipotence" of doctors in multidisciplinary team meetings, as well as the pressures encountered by parents of autistic children who are pushed to seek "care" for their child before sending him or her to school. Moreover, the Haute Autorité de Santé reminds us in its Recommendations for Good Practice in Autism, published in March 2012, that "no drug treatment cures autism", but that it is possible to seek treatments for associated disorders.

== Controversy ==
According to the journalist Olivia Cattan, Marion Leboyer had knowledge of wild therapeutic trials conducted by doctors of the Chronimed group on autistic children. In this respect, Olivia Cattan questions "how a researcher can 'accredit' the results of these 'treatments' when they have not been 'randomized' and have been carried out without any recommendation or authorization from the major health authorities?". Olivia Cattan's article refers to a hearing of Prof. Leboyer in the French Senate on February 1, 2017, on the situation of minor psychiatry in France. During this hearing, Prof. Leboyer did not speak of "therapeutic trials" but only of "observations [that] justified the request of parents' associations for autistic children for double-blind trials". Such details are not included in the aforementioned articles.

In 2017, at the request of the Fondation Autisme (Bertrand Jacques and Florent Chapel), Prof. Leboyer had considered setting up an AntibiAutism project "Minocycline treatment of High Functioning Autism Spectrum Disorder symptoms in adult patients: a double-blinded randomized controlled study", which was retained by the French Ministry of Health's Direction générale de l'Offre de soins (DGOS) within the framework of the national clinical research hospital program (PHRC-N). This project, which aimed to test the efficacy of an antibacterial antibiotic (Minocycline) in adults diagnosed with autism spectrum disorder without intellectual delay, was abandoned on the initiative of Prof. Leboyer, before any trial on patients, so that it does not appear on the 2017 PHRC-N list. This abandonment follows the observation of certain undesirable side effects when administering this antibiotic and the identification of new therapeutic agents (probiotics) targeting the same biological pathways and presenting fewer side effects.

Prof. Leboyer denies any affiliation with the Chronimed group, which, moreover, is a collective of general practitioners and not psychiatrists, as well as any association with therapeutic practices that could be qualified as irregular and about which some of the members of this group would be subject to legal proceedings.
