= Theo Peeters =

Belgian neurolinguist

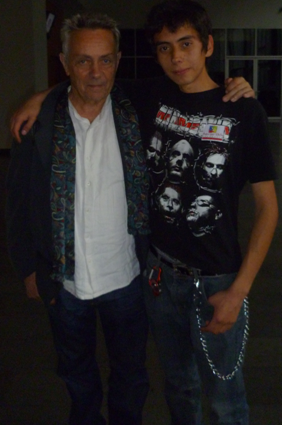
Theo Peeters (left) with Chilean actor Grex at an autism convention in Chile

Theo Peeters (Dutch pronunciation: [ˈteːjoː ˈpeːtərs]; 11 March 1943 – 2 March 2018) was a Belgian neurolinguist who specialised in autism spectrum disorders. During his career he emphasised the importance of understanding the "culture of autism", of empathising fully with individuals on the spectrum. He was the founder of the Opleidingscentrum Autisme (Centre for Training on Autism or OCA) in Antwerp, Belgium.

== Biography ==
Theo Peeters earned a Licence in Philosophy and Literature (University of Louvain), M.A. in Neurolinguistics (University of Brussels), MSc in Human Communications (University of London) and was affiliated to TEACCH, University of North Carolina at Chapel Hill. He was in charge of training professionals in the 1985 Educational Experiment in Autism sponsored by the Flemish Ministry of Education. Peeters was responsible for the Flemish-Russian project on autism, the Flemish-South African project, the Flemish-Polish Autism project and more. He was also Associate Editor of Good Autism Practice edited by Glenys Jones and Hugh Morgan in partnership with the University of Birmingham. Peeters published several books on autism, including Talking About Autism in 1980, Autism: From Theoretical Understanding to Educational Intervention in 1994 and Autism: Medical and Educational Aspects, in collaboration with Christopher Gillberg.

== Selected publications ==
- Peeters, Theo (1980). Over autisme gesproken. Nijmegen: Dekker en Van De Vegt. ISBN 90-255-9922-2.
- Peeters, Theo (1984). Uit zichzelf gekeerd. Nijmegen: Dekker en Van De Vegt. ISBN 90-255-9984-2.
- Peeters, Theo (1987). Autisme vanaf de adolescentie. Nijmegen: Dekker en Van De Vegt. ISBN 90-255-9984-2.
- Peeters, Theo (1994). Autism. From Theoretical Understanding to Educational Intervention. Wiley-Blackwell. ISBN 90-5240-230-2.
- Peeters, Theo (1994). Autisme: La forteresse éclatée. Paris: Pro Aid Autisme.
- Peeters, Theo; Gillberg, Christopher (1995). L'autisme. Aspects éducatifs et médicaux. Antwerpen: Opleidingscentrum Autisme.
- Peeters, Theo; Gillberg, Christopher (1998). Autism. Medical and Educational Aspects. Wiley-Blackwell. ISBN 0-521-54335-5.
- Peeters, Theo; Gillberg, Christopher (2003). Autisme. Medisch en educatief. Antwerpen: Houtekiet. ISBN 9052407134.
- Peeters, Theo (2008). L'autisme. De la compréhension à l'intervention. Paris: Dunod. ISBN 978-2-10-051799-2.
- Peeters, Theo (2008). Autismo: De la comprehensión teórica a la intervención educativa. Ávila: Autismo Ávila. ISBN 978-84-612-4249-8.
- Peeters, Theo (2010). Autisme. Van begrijpen tot begeleiden. Antwerpen: Houtekiet. ISBN 978-90-8924-043-9.
