= Michael Bury =

British sociologist (1945–2025)

Mike Bury
- Born: Michael Bury; 1945
- Died: 22 July 2025 (aged 79–80)
- Known for: Biographical disruption
- Title: Professor of Sociology

Academic background
- Education: University of Sussex, University of Bristol

Academic work
- Discipline: Sociology
- Sub-discipline: Medical Sociology, Sociology of Health and Illness
- Institutions: Bedford College, London, Royal Holloway, University of London

Michael Bury, commonly referred to as Mike Bury, (1945–22 July 2025) was a British sociologist known for his contributions to the sociology of health and illness and medical sociology. Sociologists Jonathan Gabe and Mary Ann Elston said Bury was "regarded as one of the most influential medical sociologists of his generation, both nationally and internationally". In the 1980s, Bury developed the widely researched concept of "biographical disruption", a framework for understanding chronic illness experiences.

== Early life and education ==
Bury spent his early years in Beckenham, Kent. He atteneded Beckenham and Penge Grammar School and then left school at the age of 16. Bury returned to school through attending part-time evening A-level courses through classes at Bromley Technical College. Bury studied for an undergraduate degree in sociology at the University of Sussex, followed by a master's degree in social sciences at the University of Bristol.

== Career ==
In 1975, Bury became a research sociology in an Arhritis and Reheumatism Council funded epidemiology unit based at Manchester University's medical school. In Manchester, Bury worked with Philip Wood which he credited with giving him "the freedom to develop research of my own".

In 1980, Bury moved to London where he took a job lecturing at Bedford College, London. At Bedford College, he worked with Margot Jefferys who was an instrumental figure in developing medical sociology in the United Kingdom. Jefferys had recently instituted the Social Research United in Bedford College's Sociology Department in collaboration with George Brown. At Bedford College, Bury directed the MSc in Medical Sociology.

With Jefferys' support, Bury became acquainted with Cyril Clark of the Royal College of Physicians and Anthea Holme. Clark secured funding for Bury and Holme to develop a national study of the health and quality of life of people over the age of 90 who were living in England, this became the 'life after ninety' survey. Research from this project led to the later book Life After Ninety. Bury said that the work from this survey indicated that "public health medicine’s preoccupation with mortality was increasingly missing the point".

Bury then taught at Royal Holloway, University of London until he retired in 2003. Bury was professor of sociology at Royal Holloway.

Bury edited Sociology of Health and Illness from 1994 to 2000. Bury was a member of the Medical Research Council's Health Services and Public Health Board, and a member of the National Institute of Health and Clinical Excellence's Public Health Interventions Advisory Committee, in addition to the Health Development Council's Public Health Advisory Board.

== Biographical disruption ==
Through his work with people diagnosed with rheumatoid arthritis, Bury developed "biographical disruption" as a concept to explore how diagnosis and illness re-shape how a person thinks of their biography and themselves. Bury presented and developed this idea in a 1982 publication in Sociology of Health and Illness. In this article, Bury said of the concept:

I have tried to suggest a perspective which conceptualises chronic illness as a particular kind of disruptive experience. This disruption throws into relief the cognitive and material resources available to individuals. It displays the key forms which explanations of pain and suffering in illness take in modern society, the continuity and discontinuity of professional and lay modes of thought and the sources of variability in experience arising from the influence of structural constraints over the ability to adapt

Bury's article on biographical disruption has proven to be "one of the most cited articles in the journal's history, with 6576 citations up to the end of January 2026".

The framework that Bury developed proved popular among sociologists and has since been applied to experiences including cancer, HIV, autism, frailty, motor neurone disease, loneliness, and Ménière's disease.

The concept has, however, received some criticism within disability studies for the risk that it may lead to "an overemphasis on how illness affects someone's sense of self and identity, at the expense of exploring the impact of broader social structures".

== Personal life ==
Bury lived in Wrotham, Kent with his wife Jenny. He had two daughters.

== Select works ==
- Bury, M. (1982). Chronic illness as biographical disruption. Sociology of health & illness, 4(2), 167–182.
- Bury, M. (1991). The sociology of chronic illness: a review of research and prospects. Sociology of health & illness, 13(4), 451–468.
- Bury, M. (2001). Illness narratives: fact or fiction?. Sociology of health & illness, 23(3), 263–285.
- Bury, M., & Holme, A. (2002). Life after ninety. Routledge.
- Bury, M. (2013). Health and illness in a changing society. Routledge.
