= Medical sociology =

Branch of sociology

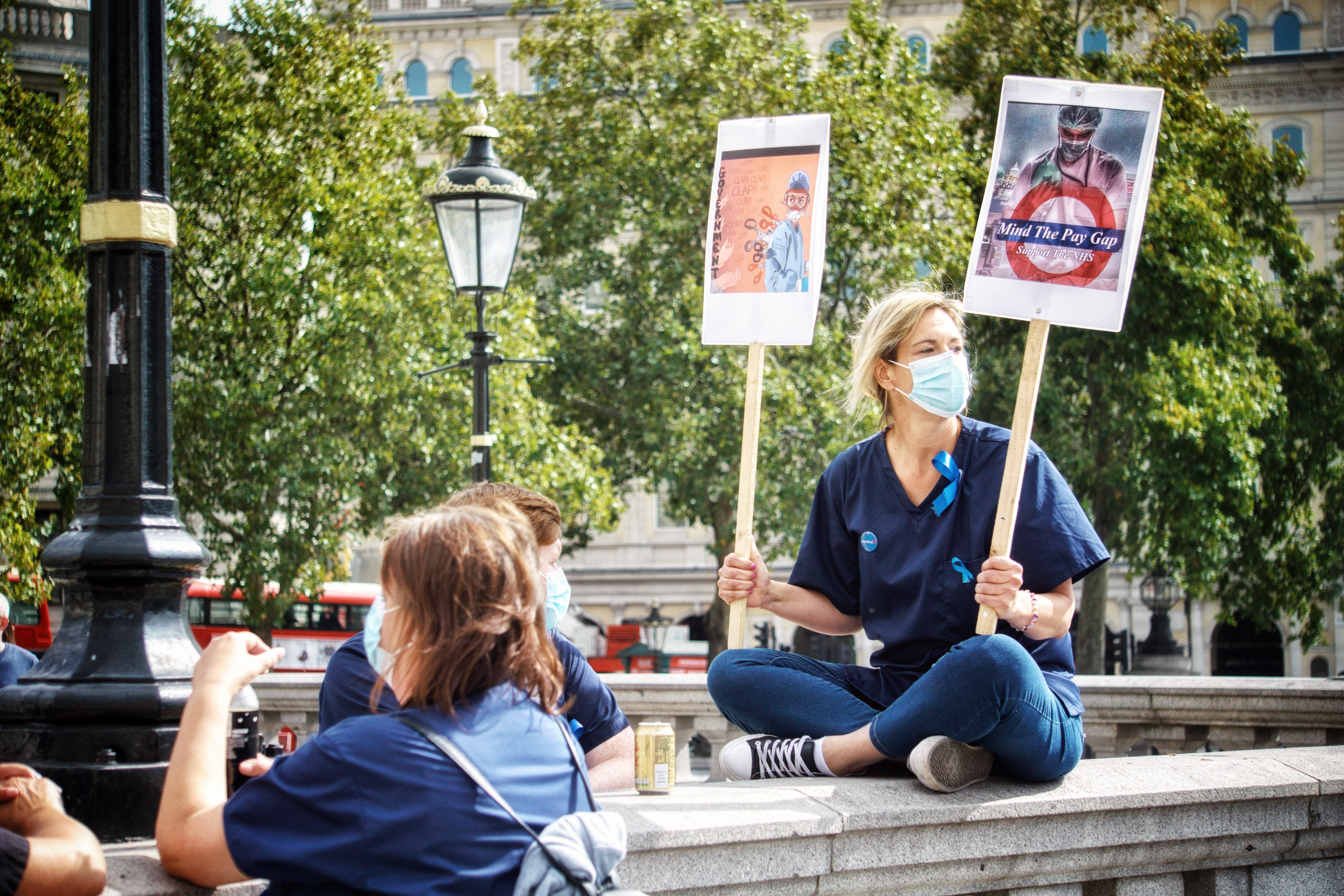
Nurses protesting at the Nurses' Protest at Trafalgar Square, UK on Saturday 12 September 2020

Medical sociology is the sociological analysis of health, illness, differential access to medical resources, the social organization of medicine, Health Care Delivery, the production of medical knowledge, selection of methods, the study of actions and interactions of healthcare professionals, and the social or cultural (rather than clinical or bodily) effects of medical practice. The field commonly interacts with the sociology of knowledge, science and technology studies, and social epistemology. Medical sociologists are also interested in the qualitative experiences of patients, doctors, and medical education; often working at the boundaries of public health, social work, demography and gerontology to explore phenomena at the intersection of the social and clinical sciences. Health disparities commonly relate to typical categories such as class, race, ethnicity, immigration, gender, sexuality, and age. Objective sociological research findings quickly become a normative and political issue.

Early work in medical sociology was conducted by Lawrence J Henderson whose theoretical interests in the work of Vilfredo Pareto inspired Talcott Parsons' interests in sociological systems theory. Parsons was one of the early leaders in medical sociology, and applied social role theory to interactional relations between sick people and others. Later other sociologists such as Eliot Freidson have taken a conflict theory perspective, looking at how the medical profession secures its own interests. Key contributors to medical sociology since the 1950s include Howard S. Becker, Mike Bury, Peter Conrad, Jack Douglas, Eliot Freidson, David Silverman, Phil Strong, Bernice Pescosolido, Carl May, Anne Rogers, Anselm Strauss, Renee Fox, and Joseph W. Schneider.

The field of medical sociology is usually taught as part of a wider sociology, clinical psychology or health studies degree course, or on dedicated master's degree courses where it is sometimes combined with the study of medical ethics and bioethics. In Britain, sociology was introduced into the medical curriculum following the Goodenough report in 1944: "In medicine, 'social explanations' of the etiology of disease meant for some doctors a redirection of medical thought from the purely clinical and psychological criteria of illness. The introduction of 'social' factors into medical explanation was most strongly evidenced in branches of medicine closely related to the community — Social Medicine and, later, General Practice".

== History ==
Samuel W. Bloom argues that the study of medical sociology has a long history but tended to be done as one of advocacy in response to social events rather than a field of study. He cites the 1842 publication of the sanitary conditions of the labouring population of Great Britain as a good example of such research. This medical sociology included an element of social science, studying social structures as a cause or mediating factor in disease, such as for public health or social medicine.

Bloom argues the development of medical sociology is linked to the development of sociology within American universities. He argues that the 1865 creation of the American Social Science Association (ASSA) was a key event in this development. ASSA's initial aim was policy reform on the basis of science. Bloom argues that over the next few decades the role of ASSA moved from advocacy to academic discipline, noting that a number of academic professional bodies broke away from the ASSA during this period, starting with the American Historical Association in 1884. The American Sociological Society formed in 1905.

The Russell Sage Foundation, formed in 1907, was a large philanthropic organization which worked closely with the American Sociological Society, which had medical sociology as a primary focus of its suggested policy reform. Bloom argues that the presidency of Donald R Young, a professor of sociology, that started in 1947 was significant in the development of medical sociology. Young motivated by a desire to legitimize sociology, encouraged Esther Lucile Brown, an anthropologist who studied the professions, to focus her work on the medical professions due to medicine's societal status.

=== Harry Stock Sullivan ===
Harry Stack Sullivan was a psychiatrist who investigated the treatment of schizophrenia using approaches of interpersonal psychotherapy working with sociologists and social scientists including Lawrence K. Frank, W. I. Thomas, Ruth Benedict, Harold Lasswell and Edward Sapir. Bloom argues that Sullivans work, and its focus on putative interpersonal causes and treatment of schizophrenia influenced ethnographic study of the hospital setting.

== Medical profession ==
The profession of medicine has been studied by sociologists. Talcott Parsons looked at the profession from a functionalist perspective, focusing on medics roles as experts, their altruism, and how they support communities. Other sociologists have taken a conflict theory perspective, looking at how the medical profession secures its own interests. Of these, Marxist conflict theory perspective considers how the ruling classes can enact power through medicine, while other theories propose a more structural pluralist approach, exemplified by Eliot Freidson, looking at how the professions themselves secure influence.

=== Medical education ===
The study of medical education has been a central part of medical sociology since its emergence in the 1950s. The first publication on the topic was Robert Merton's The Student Physician. Other scholars who studied the field include Howard S. Becker, with his publication Boys in White.

The hidden curriculum is a concept in medical education that refers to a distinction between what is officially taught and what is learned by a medical student. The concept was introduced by Philip W. Jackson in his book Life in the Classroom, but developed further by Benson Snyder. The concept has been criticised by Lakomski and there has been considerable debate on the concepts within the educational community.

=== Medical dominance ===
Writing the 1970s, Eliot Freidson argued that medicine had reached a point of "professional dominance" over the content of their work, other health professions and their clients by convincing the public of medicine's effectiveness, gaining a legal monopoly over their work, and appropriating other "medical" knowledge through control of training. This concept of dominance has been extended to professions as a whole in closure theory, where professions are seen as competing for scope of practice, for example in the work of Andrew Abbott. Coburn argues that academic interest in medical dominance has decreased over time due to the increased role of capitalism in healthcare in the US, challenges to the control of health policy by politicians, economists and planners, and increased agency of patients through access to the internet. Sociologist nursing professor Kath M. Melia argues that so far as nurses are concerned, medical paternalistic attitudes have remained.

== Medicalization ==
Medicalization describes the process whereby an ever-wider range of human experiences are defined, experienced and treated as a medical condition. Examples of medicalization can be seen in deviance, such as defining addiction or antisocial personality disorder as a medical condition. Feminist scholars have shown that the female body is prone to medicalization, arguing that the tendency of viewing the female body as the Other has been a factor in this.

Medicalization can obscure social factors by defining a condition as existing entirely within an individual and can be depoliticizing, suggesting than an intervention should be medical when the best intervention is political. Medicalization can give the profession of medicine undue influence.

== Social construction of illness ==
Social constructionists study the relationships between ideas about illness and expression, perception and understanding of illness by individuals, institutions and society. Social constructionists study why diseases exist in one place and not another, or disappear from a particular area. For example, premenstrual syndrome, anorexia nervosa and susto appear to exist in some cultures but not others.

There are a broad range of social constructionist frameworks used in medical sociology that make different assumptions about the relationships between ideas, social processes and the material world. Illnesses vary in the degree to which their definition is socially constructed; some illnesses are straightforwardly biological. For straightforwardly biological diseases, it would not be meaningful to describe them as a social construction, though it might be meaningful to study the social processes that resulted in the discovery of the disease.

Some illnesses are contested when a patient complains about a disease despite the medical community being unable to find a biological mechanism for disease. Examples of contested diseases include myalgic encephalomyelitis/chronic fatigue syndrome (ME/CFS), fibromyalgia and Gulf War syndrome. Contested diseases can be studied as social constructs but there is no biomedical understanding. Some contested diseases, such as ME/CFS, are accepted by the institutions of biomedicine while others, such as environmental diseases, are not.

=== Sick role ===
The study of the social construction of illness within medical sociology can be traced to Talcott Parsons' notion of the sick role. Parsons introduced the notion of the sick role in his book The Social System. Parsons argued that the sick role is a social role approved and enforced by social norms and institutional behaviours where an individual is viewed as showing certain behaviour because they are in need of support.

Parsons argues that defining properties are that the sick person is exempt from normal social roles, that they are not "responsible" for their condition, that they should try to get well, and that they should seek technically competent people to help them.

The concept of the sick role has been critiqued by sociologists from neo-marxist, phenomonological and social interactionist perspectives, as well as by those with anti-establishment viewpoints. Burnham argues that part of this criticism is a rejection of functionalism due to its associations with conservatism. The sick role fell out of favour in the 1990s.

=== Labelling theory ===
Labelling theory is derived from the work of Howard S. Becker, who studied the sociology of marijuana use. He argued that norms and deviant behaviour are partly the result of the definitions applied by others. Eliot Freidson applied these concepts to illness.

Labelling theory separates the aspects of an individual's behaviour caused by an illness, and that which is caused by the application of a label. Freidson distinguished labels based on legitimacy and the degree to which to this legitimacy affected an individual's responsibilities.

Labelling theory has been criticized on the grounds that it does not explain which behaviours are labelled as deviant and why people engage in behaviours which are labelled as deviant: labelling theory is not a complete theory of deviant behaviour.

=== Mental health ===
An illness framework is the dominant framework for disease in psychiatry and diagnosis is considered worthwhile. Psychiatry has emphasized the biological when considering mental illness. Some psychiatrists have criticized this model: some prefer biopsychosocial definitions, while others prefer social constructionist models, and still others have argued that madness is an intelligent response if all circumstances are understood (Laing and Esterson). Thomas Szasz, who trained as a psychiatrist, argued that mental health was a bad concept in his 1961 book The Myth of Mental Illness, arguing that minds can only be ill metaphorically.

== Doctor–patient relationship ==
The doctor–patient relationship, the social interactions between healthcare providers and those who interact with them, is studied by medical sociology. There are different models for the interaction between a patient and doctor, which may have been more or less prevalent at different times. One such model is medical consumerism, which has partly given way to patient consumerism.

=== Medical paternalism ===
Medical paternalism is the perspective that doctors want what is best for the patient and must take decisions on behalf of the patient because the patient is not competent to make their own decisions. Parsons argued that though there was an asymmetry of knowledge and power in the doctor–patient relationship, the medical system provided sufficient safeguards to protect the patient, justifying a paternalistic role by the doctor and medical system.

A system of medical paternalism was prominent following the second world war through to the mid-1960s. Writing in the 1970s, Eliot Freidson referred to medicine as having "professional dominance", determining its work and defining a conceptualization of the problems that are brought to it and the best solutions to them. Professional dominance is defined by three characteristics: practitioners having power over clients, for example through dependency, knowledge, or location asymmetry; control over juniors in the field, requiring juniors' deference and submission; and control over other professions either by excluding them from practice, or placing them under control of the medical profession.

Yeyoung Oh Nelson argues that this system of paternalism was in part undermined by organizational change in the following decades in the US whereby insurance companies, managers and the pharmaceutical industry started competing for role of conceptualizing and delivering medical services, part of the motive being cost-saving.

== Bioethics ==
Bioethics studies ethical concern in medical treatment and research. Many scholars believe that bioethics arose due to a perceived lack of accountability of the medical profession, the field has been broadly adopted with most US hospitals offering some form of ethical consultation. The social effects of the field of bioethics have been studied by medical sociologists. Informed consent, having its roots in bioethics, is the process by which a doctor and a patient agree to a particular intervention. Medical sociology studies the social processes that influence and at times limit consent.

== Related fields ==
=== Social medicine ===
Social medicine is a similar field to medical sociology in that it tries to conceptualize social interactions in investigating how the study of social interactions can be used in medicine. However, the two fields have different training, career paths, titles, funding and publication.In the 2010s, Rose and Callard argued that this distinction may be arbitrary.

In the 1950s, Strauss argued that it was important to maintain the independence of medical sociology from medicine so that there was a different perspective on sociology separate from the aims of medicine. Strauss feared that if medical sociology started to adopt the goals expected by medicine it risked losing its focus on analysing society. These fears that have been echoed since by Reid, Gold and Timmermans. Rosenfeld argues that the study of sociology focused solely on making recommendations for medicine has limited use for theory building and its findings cease to apply in different social situations.

Richard Boulton argues that medical sociology and social medicine are "co-produced" in the sense that social medicine responds to the conceptualization of medical practices created by medical sociology and alters medical practice and medical understanding in response, and that the effects of these changes are then analyzed by medical sociology once again. He argues that the tendency to view certain theories such as the scientific method (positivism) as the basis for all knowledge, and conversely the tendency to view all knowledge as associated with some activity both risk undermining the field of medical sociology.

=== Medical anthropology ===
Peter Conrad notes that medical anthropology studies some of the same phenomena as medical sociology but argues that medical anthropology has different origins, originally studying medicine within non-western cultures and using different methodologies. He argues that there was some convergence between the disciplines, as medical sociology started to adopt some of the methodologies of anthropology such as qualitative research and began to focus more on the patient, and medical anthropology started to focus on western medicine. He argues that more interdisciplinary communication could improve both disciplines.

== See also ==
- Epidemiological transition
- Gothenburg Study of Children with DAMP
- Health disparities
- Medicalization
- Sociology of health and illness
- Social medicine
- Stroke Belt
