= Esther Lucile Brown =

Social anthropologist (1898–1990)

- Born: May 2, 1898; Manchester, New Hampshire, U.S.
- Died: July 6, 1990 (aged 92); San Francisco, California, U.S.

Academic background
- Education: Yale University

Academic work
- Discipline: Social anthropology

Esther Lucile Brown was a social anthropologist. She studied the professions while working at the Russell Sage Foundation.

== Personal life ==
Brown was born and grew up in New Hampshire. She never married, but had two goddaughters.

== Career ==
Brown said that she was very influenced by sociology to the degree that she considered the two fields to be joined. Brown studied the work of professions including engineering, nursing, law, social work and medicine and became head of the newly created Department of Studies in the Professions at the Russell Sage Foundation.

At the Russell Sage Foundation, Brown was responsible for encouraging social anthropologists and sociologists to undertake teaching and research in medical settings.

Since the 1930s, Brown argued that nurses should be aware of patients' cultural backgrounds to improve care. She was asked to study the nursing profession following the nursing shortages of World War II, resulting in the publication of the report Nursing for the Future. In the 1970s, Brown argued for more academic specialism within medicine, publishing Nursing Reconsidered: A Study of Change.

Brown studied psychiatric hospitals in the 1950s with Greenblatt and York, resulting in the publication of From Custodial to Therapeutic Care in Mental Hospitals, which was influential in the movement towards community treatment of those diagnosed with mental health disorders.

== See also ==
- Medical sociology
