= Gothenburg Study of Children with DAMP =

The Gothenburg Study of Children with DAMP was a study of six-year-old children in Gothenburg, Sweden that began in 1977. The purpose was to find out what proportion of the children had Deficits in Attention, Motor control and Perception (DAMP), formerly known as Minimal Brain Disorder (MBD), and to follow the development of that group over the years. The results and discussions have been published in four dissertations and approximately 30 scientific papers.

== The study ==
The first phase of the study was designed mainly by Christopher Gillberg and Peder Rasmussen. Initially, preschool teachers in all areas of Gothenburg were asked to answer a questionnaire with a series of yes and no questions to identify children that possibly had MBD. (The questionnaire was based on an earlier pilot study.) The researchers used a purely operational (symptom-based) definition of MBD that had been devised especially for the study and was later termed DAMP.

The researchers received questionnaires for more than 3400 children. which constituted around 72% of the total population. 340 children (10%) were identified, based on the questionnaires, as having problems that could indicate MBD. Out of this group of 340, all the children that seemed to have the most severe problems and a random sample of the others were selected for a detailed examination.

In the Gothenburg study, a questionnaire for preschool teachers was used from which children with some potential psychiatric problems were classified into either a high-index or a low-index group. In the final investigation, there were 22 children (14 boys and 8 girls) in the high-index group and 60 children (52 boys and 8 girls) in the low-index group. These were compared with a randomly selected control group. The control group ultimately consisted of 59 children (29 boys and 30 girls). Of the total of 141 children, 42 (33 boys and 9 girls) were diagnosed as having MBD/DAMP; of the 42, 40 were in the index group (18 in the high-index group) and 2 in the control group. All the children were initially age 6–7 (born 1971) and were from Gothenburg, Sweden. The children were later investigated at ages 10, 13, 16, and 22.

== Allegations and destruction ==
Leif Elinder, a Swedish pediatrician and Eva Kärfve, a sociologist at the University of Lund, had for a number of years written numerous articles and a book where they rejected most of neuropsychiatry, and specifically most research carried out by the Gillberg group. Kärfve also wrote a book on the topic called "Hjärnspöken Damp och hotet mot folkhälsan" (English translation: Brain-spooks Damp and the threat against public health" in which Elinder also wrote a chapter regarding treating children with amphetamines.

In her book she asserted that the diagnostic criteria for DAMP was vague, as well as highlighted that the quality in the statistical data was poor. Gillsbergs study was also characterized by arbitrary selection processes, questionable operationalization as well as methods of measurement and a high drop out rate, etc. With data from a control group of two children Gillberg also drew the conclusion that 3,1% more of the population can be assumed have DAMP. This raised their initial figure of 4% to 7,1%. Gillberg himself called this unreliable, but nevertheless proceeded to use the 7,1% figure. As did the child-neurologist Magnus Landgren 18 years later in other work.

Eva Kärfve and Leif Elinder wrote letters to University of Gothenburg where they accused Gillberg and Rasmussen of scientific misconduct. The specific accusation was that they had added participants to the control group for the final follow-up study at age 22. The accusations were investigated by the Ethics Council at the University of Gothenburg and dismissed as baseless.

In February 2002 Eva Kärfve demanded access (as a private person) to all the records from the Gothenburg study.

In April 2002 Leif Elinder wrote University of Gothenburg, demanding the University make an investigation whether "good ethical standard of research" had been followed.

In July 2002 Leif Elinder demanded access to records from the Gothenburg study.

Eva Kärve and Leif Elinder were denied access by University of Gothenburg. The reason for this denial of access was that the material contained highly sensitive data, that the participants had been promised full confidentiality, that Elinder and Kärfve would use the material as private citizens, and that the participants were strongly against giving them access.

Elinder and Kärfve then took the matter to court, where it was decided that they would be allowed full access to the research material. Kammarrätten (an administrative court in Sweden) decided 2003-02-06 that Elinder and Kärfve would be allowed access under the conditions in Swedish secrecy laws. Kammarrätten decided that the University would decide the conditions which would protect the interests of individuals.

The University of Gothenburg decided 2003-04-07 the conditions which Eva Kärfve had to follow to gain access to the material. After an appeal of Eva Kärfve, Kammarrätten decided 2003-08-11 the exact conditions which Eva Kärfve needed to follow to gain access to the material.

The researchers and the University tried to use all legal possibilities to avoid giving out the medical records which constituted 22 shelf meters (about 100,000 pages, video and sound recordings).

In May 2004 when it appeared that the University would be forced to hand the material over, three of Gillberg's coworkers decided to destroy most of the research material. In June 2005 Gillberg and the Rector of University of Gothenburg were convicted for not handing the material over to Kärfve and Elinder. Gillberg received a suspended sentence and a fine; the Rector received a fine. In March 2006 the three coworkers were convicted for destroying the data. Each of the three received a suspended sentence and a fine: Peder Rasmussen, Carina Gillberg (wife of Christopher Gillberg), and Kerstin Lamberg.

Lamberg is vice-chairman of the Autism (Patients) Society (Riksföreningen Autism). Both the Autism Society and the Attention (Patients) Society (Riksförbundet Attention) have remained strong supporters of Gillberg.

== Other criticisms ==
In 2005, Per-Anders Rydelius, Professor of Child Psychiatry at the Karolinska Institute, and Rolf Zetterstrom, past chief editor of Acta Paediatrica, have been critical of some research based on the Gothenburg study. In the Swedish trade journal Dagens Medicin they argued that the Gillberg group, in order to prove their hypothesis, repeatedly changed diagnoses and information in their material: "Accessible articles (from the Gillberg group) reveal that those studied have been managed in an unscientific way - a conclusion which does not need strengthening by what could have been found in the destroyed research material". (Another problem is the boy:girl ratios in the study; the ratio in the control group is 1:1, whereas the ratio in the index groups is 4:1.)

== Reactions ==
The major Swedish newspapers have had tens of stories on the controversy: Dagens Nyheter, Svenska Dagbladet, Göteborgs-Posten, etc. There was also a one-hour program about DAMP on Swedish TV that discussed the controversy over Gillberg's Gothenburg study at length.

In Norway, the newspaper Dagsavisen ran a series of critical stories.

== See also ==
- Christopher Gillberg
- Medicalization
- ADHD
- Hyperkinetic disorder
