= Medicalization =

Categorization of human problems as medical

Medicalization is the process by which human conditions and problems come to be defined and treated as medical conditions, and thus become the subject of medical study, diagnosis, prevention, or treatment. Medicalization can be driven by new evidence or hypotheses about conditions; by changing social attitudes or economic considerations; or by the development of new medications or treatments.

Medicalization is studied from a sociologic perspective in terms of the role and power of professionals, patients, and corporations, and also for its implications for ordinary people whose self-identity and life decisions may depend on the prevailing concepts of health and illness. Once a condition is classified as medical, a medical model of disability tends to be used in place of a social model. Medicalization may also be termed pathologization or (pejoratively) "disease mongering". Since medicalization is the social process through which a condition becomes seen as a medical disease in need of treatment, appropriate medicalization may be viewed as a benefit to human society. The identification of a condition as a disease can lead to the treatment of certain symptoms and conditions, which will improve overall quality of life.

== History ==
The concept of medicalization was devised by sociologists to explain how medical knowledge is applied to behaviors which are not self-evidently medical or biological. The term medicalization entered the sociology literature in the 1970s in the works of Irving Zola, Peter Conrad and Thomas Szasz, among others. According to Eric Cassell's book, The Nature of Suffering and the Goals of Medicine (2004), the expansion of medical social control is being justified as a means of explaining deviance. These sociologists viewed medicalization as a form of social control in which medical authority expanded into domains of everyday existence, and they rejected medicalization in the name of liberation. This critique was embodied in works such as Conrad's article "The discovery of hyperkinesis: notes on medicalization of deviance", published in 1973 (hyperkinesis was the term then used to describe what we might now call ADHD).

These sociologists did not believe medicalization to be a new phenomenon, arguing that medical authorities had always been concerned with social behavior and traditionally functioned as agents of social control (Foucault, 1965; Szasz,1970; Rosen). However, these authors took the view that increasingly sophisticated technology had extended the potential reach of medicalization as a form of social control, especially in terms of "psychotechnology" (Chorover,1973).

In the 1975 book Limits to medicine: Medical nemesis (1975), Ivan Illich put forth one of the earliest uses of the term "medicalization". Illich, a philosopher, argued that the medical profession harms people through iatrogenesis, a process in which illness and social problems increase due to medical intervention. Illich saw iatrogenesis occurring on three levels: the clinical, involving serious side effects worse than the original condition; the social, whereby the general public is made docile and reliant on the medical profession to cope with life in their society; and the structural, whereby the idea of aging and dying as medical illnesses effectively "medicalized" human life and left individuals and societies less able to deal with these "natural" processes.

The concept of medicalization dovetailed with some aspects of the 1970s feminist movement. Critics such as Ehrenreich and English (1978) argued that women's bodies were being medicalized by the predominantly male medical profession. Menstruation and pregnancy had come to be seen as medical problems requiring interventions such as hysterectomies.

Marxists such as Vicente Navarro (1980) linked medicalization to an oppressive capitalist society. They argued that medicine disguised the underlying causes of disease, such as social inequality and poverty, and instead presented health as an individual issue. Others examined the power and prestige of the medical profession, including the use of terminology to mystify and of professional rules to exclude or subordinate others.

Tiago Correia (2017) offers an alternative perspective on medicalization. He argues that medicalization needs to be detached from biomedicine to overcome much of the criticism it has faced, and to protect its value in contemporary sociological debates. Building on Gadamer's hermeneutical view of medicine, he focuses on medicine's common traits, regardless of empirical differences in both time and space. Medicalization and social control are viewed as distinct analytical dimensions that in practice may or may not overlap. Correia contends that the idea of "making things medical" needs to include all forms of medical knowledge in a global society, not simply those forms linked to the established (bio)medical professions. Looking at "knowledge", beyond the confines of professional boundaries, may help us understand the multiplicity of ways in which medicalization can exist in different times and societies, and allow contemporary societies to avoid such pitfalls as "demedicalization" (through a turn towards complementary and alternative medicine) on the one hand, or the over-rapid and unregulated adoption of biomedical medicine in non-western societies on the other. The challenge is to determine what medical knowledge is present, and how it is being used to medicalize behaviors and symptoms.

== Areas ==
=== Sexuality and gender ===
Many aspects of human sexuality have been medicalized and pathologised by psychiatry, psychology and the pharmaceutical industry. This includes masturbation, homosexuality, erectile dysfunction and female sexual dysfunction. Medicalization has also been used to justify sexualisation of transgender people, intersex people and those diagnosed with HIV/AIDS. The medicalization of sexuality has resulted in increased social control, disease mongering, surveillance, and increased funding in some research areas of sexology and human physiology. The practice of medicalizing sexuality has been widely criticized, with one of the most common criticisms being that the biological reductionism and other tenets of medicalisation, individualism and naturalism, generally fail to take into account sociocultural factors contributing to human sexuality.

The HIV/AIDS pandemic allegedly caused from the 1980s a "profound re-medicalization of sexuality".

The diagnosis of premenstrual dysphoric disorder (PMDD) has caused some controversy when fluoxetine (also known as Prozac) was being repackaged as a PMDD therapy under the trade named Sarafem. The psychologist Peggy Kleinplatz has criticized the diagnosis as the medicalization of normal human behavior. Other medicalized aspects of women's health include infertility, breastfeeding, the childbirth process, and postpartum depression.

Although it has received less attention, it is claimed that masculinity has also faced medicalization, being deemed damaging to health and requiring regulation or enhancement through drugs, technologies or therapy. Specifically, erectile dysfunction was once considered a natural part of the aging process in men, but has since been medicalized as a problem, late-onset hypogonadism.

According to Mike Fitzpatrick, resistance to medicalization was a common theme of the gay liberation, anti-psychiatry, and feminist movements of the 1970s, but now there is "virtually no resistance to the advance of government intrusion in lifestyle if it is deemed to be justified in terms of public health." Moreover, the pressure for medicalization now comes from society itself as well as from the government and medical professionals.

=== Psychiatry ===
For many years, marginalized psychiatrists (such as Peter Breggin, Paula Caplan, Thomas Szasz) and outside critics (such as Stuart A. Kirk) have "been accusing psychiatry of engaging in the systematic medicalization of normality". More recently these concerns have come from insiders who have worked for and promoted the American Psychiatric Association (e.g., Robert Spitzer, Allen Frances).

Benjamin Rush, the father of American psychiatry, claimed that Black people had black skin because they were ill with hereditary leprosy. Consequently, he considered vitiligo as a "spontaneous cure".

According to Franco Basaglia and his followers, whose approach pointed out the role of psychiatric institutions in the control and medicalization of deviant behaviors and social problems, psychiatry is used as the provider of scientific support for social control to the existing establishment, and the ensuing standards of deviance and normality brought about repressive views of discrete social groups. As scholars have long argued, governmental and medical institutions code menaces to authority as mental diseases during political disturbances.

According to Nicholas Kittrie, a number of phenomena considered "deviant", such as alcoholism, drug addiction, prostitution, pedophilia, and masturbation ("self-abuse"), were originally considered as moral, then legal, and now medical problems. Innumerable other conditions such as obesity, smoking cigarettes, draft malingering, bachelorhood, divorce, unwanted pregnancy, kleptomania, and grief, have been declared diseases by medical and psychiatric authorities. Due to these perceptions, peculiar deviants were subjected to moral, then legal, and now medical modes of social control. Similarly, Conrad and Schneider concluded their review of the medicalization of deviance by identifying three major paradigms that have reigned over deviance designations in different historical periods: deviance as sin; deviance as crime; and deviance as sickness.

According to Thomas Szasz, "the therapeutic state swallows up everything human on the seemingly rational ground that nothing falls outside the province of health and medicine, just as the theological state had swallowed up everything human on the perfectly rational ground that nothing falls outside the province of God and religion".

=== Labeling theory ===
A 2002 editorial in the British Medical Journal warned of inappropriate medicalization leading to disease mongering, where the boundaries of the definition of illnesses are expanded to include personal problems as medical problems or risks of diseases are emphasized to broaden the market for medications. The authors noted:

Inappropriate medicalisation carries the dangers of unnecessary labelling, poor treatment decisions, iatrogenic illness, and economic waste, as well as the opportunity costs that result when resources are diverted away from treating or preventing more serious disease. At a deeper level it may help to feed unhealthy obsessions with health, obscure or mystify sociological or political explanations for health problems, and focus undue attention on pharmacological, individualised, or privatised solutions.

== Healthism ==
Public health campaigns have been criticized as a form of "healthism", which is moralistic in nature rather than primarily focused on health. Medical doctors Petr Shkrabanek and James McCormick wrote a series of publications on this topic in the late 1980s and early 1990s criticizing the UK's Health of The Nation campaign. These publications exposed abuse of epidemiology and statistics by public health authorities and organizations to support lifestyle interventions and screening programs. Inculcating a fear of ill-health and a strong notion of individual responsibility has been derided as "health fascism" by some scholars as it objectifies the individual without considering emotional or social factors.

== Professionals, patients, corporations and society ==
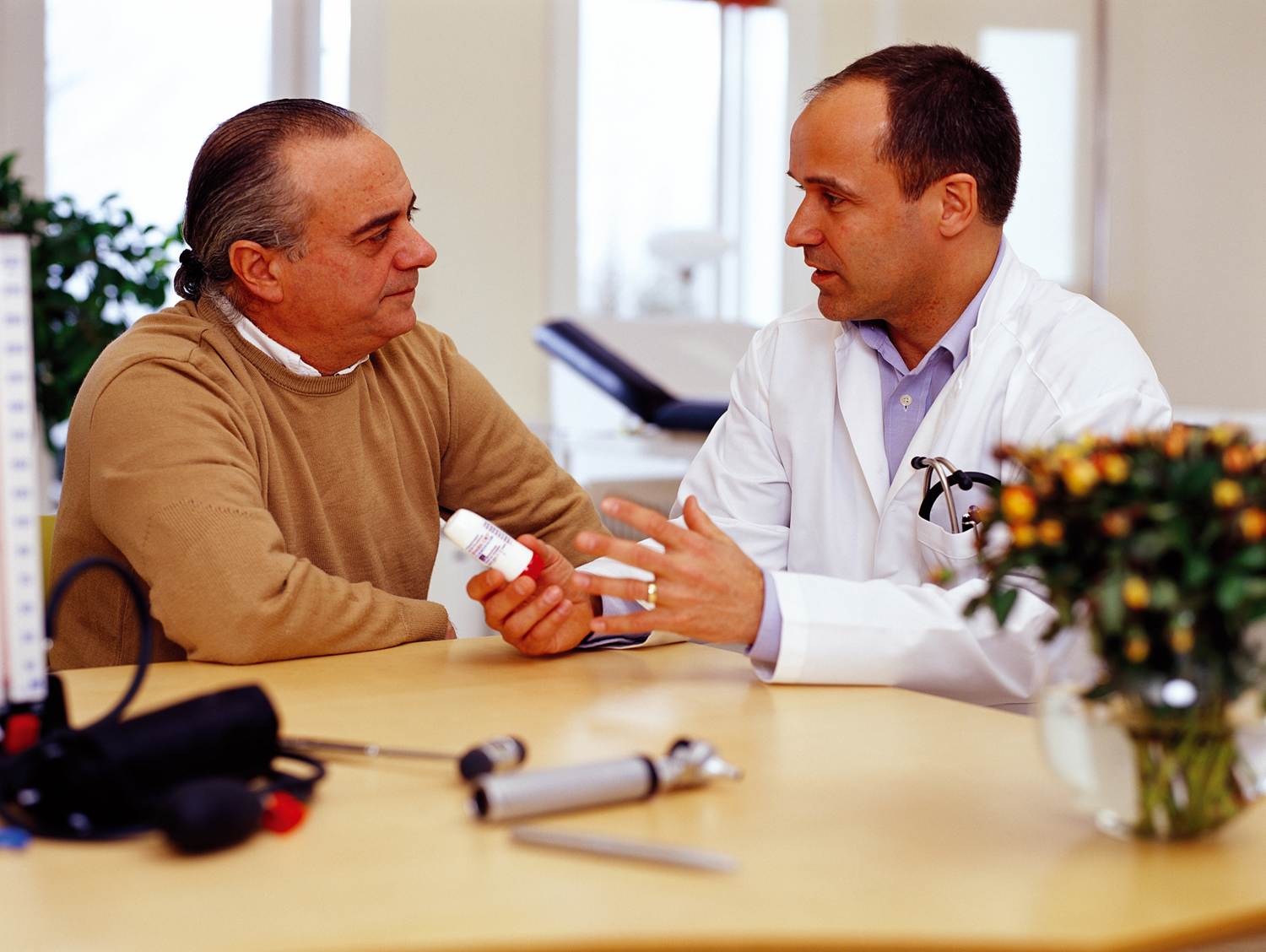
Conversation between doctor and patient

Several decades on the definition of medicalization is complicated, if for no other reason than because the term is so widely used. Many contemporary critics position pharmaceutical companies in the space once held by doctors as the supposed catalysts of medicalization. Titles such as "The making of a disease" or "Sex, drugs, and marketing" critique the pharmaceutical industry for shunting everyday problems into the domain of professional biomedicine. At the same time, others reject as implausible any suggestion that society rejects drugs or drug companies and highlight that the same drugs that are allegedly used to treat deviances from societal norms also help many people live their lives. Even scholars who critique the societal implications of brand-name drugs generally remain open to these drugs' curative effects – a far cry from earlier calls for a revolution against the biomedical establishment. The emphasis in many quarters has come to be on "overmedicalization" rather than "medicalization" in itself.

Others, however, argue that in practice the process of medicalization tends to strip subjects of their social context, so they come to be understood in terms of the prevailing biomedical ideology, resulting in a disregard for overarching social causes such as unequal distribution of power and resources. A series of publications by Mens Sana Monographs have focused on medicine as a corporate capitalist enterprise.

Scholars argue that in the late 20th century transformation within the health sector in the US altered the relationship between people in the healthcare sector. This has been attributed to the commodification of healthcare and the role of parties other than doctors such as insurance companies, the pharmaceutical industry, and the government (who prescribes without examining individuals), referred to collectively as countervailing powers. The doctor remains an authority figure who prescribes pharmaceuticals to patients. However, in some countries, such as the US, ubiquitous direct-to-consumer advertising encourages patients to ask for particular drugs by name, thereby creating a conversation between consumer and drug company that threatens to cut the doctor out of the loop. Additionally, there is a widespread concern regarding the extent of the pharmaceutical marketing direct to doctors and other healthcare professionals. Examples of this direct marketing are visits by salespeople, funding of journals, training courses or conferences, incentives for prescribing, and the routine provision of "information" written by the pharmaceutical company. The role of patients in this economy has also changed. Once regarded as passive victims of medicalization, patients can now occupy active positions as advocates, consumers, or even agents of change.

In response to theory based on medicalisation being insufficient to explain social processes, some scholars have developed a concept of biomedicalization which argues that technical and scientific interventions are transforming medicine. One aspect is pharmaceuticalization, the influence of the use of pharmaceutical drugs rather than other interventions. Other components are computerization of parts of healthcare such as public health, the creation of a "biopolitical economy" of private research outside of state, the perception of health as a moral obligation.

Medicalization has brought health issues to the fore, influencing people to think more about their bodies and activities in terms of health and to act to promote health. However, at the same time as medicalization, "paramedicalization" has also strengthened: many treatments for which there is no medical basis are popular and commercially successful.

== See also ==
- Interventionism (medicine)
- Gothenburg Study of Children with DAMP
- Medical model
- Sociology of health and illness
- Social stigma
