= FondaMental foundation =

Organization in Créteil, France

The FondaMental foundation (French: Fondation FondaMental) is a French scientific research foundation, established in 2007 to promote collaborative medical research in the field of mental health.

== Name ==
Fondamental means "fundamental" in French, and is simultaneously a portmanteau of fondation ("foundation") and mental ("mental").

== History ==
FondaMental was created by the French Research Ministry, by executive order (French: décret) on 15 June 2007. By 2011, it had established eight mental health expert centers within existing hospital facilities in Créteil, Paris, Versailles, Bordeaux, Nancy, Montpellier, Grenoble, and Marseille. By 2017, the number of FondaMental-supported expert centers had grown to 43: 12 on bipolar disorder, 10 on schizophrenia, 8 on high-functioning autism, and 13 on treatment-resistant depression.

== Operations and organization ==
FondaMental fosters mental health care and frontier research on mental health science, with an emphasis on multidisciplinary approaches. It also conducts initiatives in the areas of medical and scientific training, public education, and policy advocacy in relation with mental health, mostly in France.

Its main governing body is a Board of directors (French: conseil d'administration), chaired as of mid-2022 by David de Rothschild. The foundation's CEO since its creation has been prominent mental health scientist and practitioner Marion Leboyer. Its Director of Research is Pierre-Michel Llorca.

== Controversy ==
The teams at FondaMental use brain-machine interfaces (BMI) for the diagnosis and treatment of language disorders. This allows patients to move around in the street and carry out their daily activities, including professional ones, while being connected to a remote computer. An ultrasound, only perceptible in the patient's brain, serves as a "tracking beacon" (similar to a permanent tinnitus). However, during follow-up, it became apparent that the loss of discernment was strongly felt by the patient. The patient constantly felt spied upon, as did those around them, leading to a categorization of their actions, "choices," and decisions as "choices without free will," which poses an ethical and moral dilemma.

The question then arises regarding the value placed on the patient's choice concerning their professional life, personal life, family, and emotional life, as well as their criminal responsibility in the event of reprehensible actions related to their abrupt personality change. FondaMental raises significant ethical questions, and its methods are not unanimously accepted, with neurotechnologies being in constant progress.

== See also ==
- Mental Health Foundation
- Foundation for People with Learning Disabilities
- American Mental Health Foundation
- World Federation for Mental Health
