= Thomas Bourgeron =

French scientist

- Born: 9 November 1965 (age 59)
- Education: Université de Paris-Descartes
- Known for: Discovery of autism-related mutations
- Awards: Member of the French Academy of Sciences, Institut Universitaire de France, Academia Europaea
- Scientific career
- Fields: Genetics
- Institutions: Université de Paris-Diderot, Institut Pasteur

Thomas Bourgeron is a French scientist working at the Institut Pasteur. His group discovered the first monogenic mutations involved in autism. He is a member of the French Academy of sciences. He works on genes, changes in synapse properties and changes in circadian rhythm in autism-spectrum disorders.
