= Olivia Cattan =

French journalist and writer

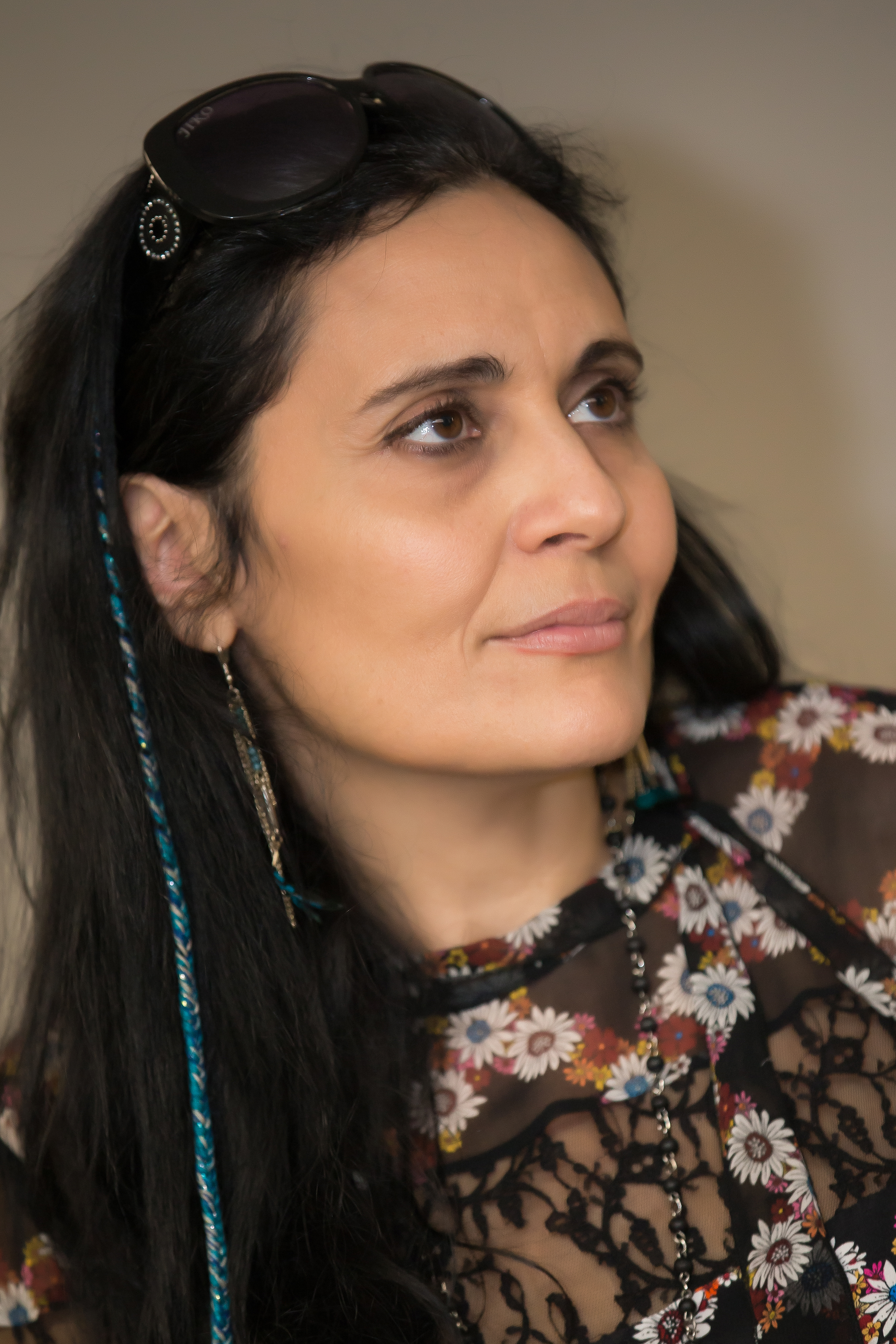
- Born: 1967 (age 58–59); Paris, France
- Occupations: Journalist author campaigner: notably on feminist causes and autism
- Children: 1

Olivia Cattan (born 1967) is a French journalist and author. She is also a campaigner. Cattan is president of "SOS autisme France" and honorary president of the campaigning feminist organisation, "Paroles de femmes" ("Women's Words") which she established.

== Life ==
Olivia Cattan was born in Paris. She attended a bilingual school and studied piano at the École Normale de Musique de Paris (music conservatory) and at other institutions. She embarked on a career as lyricist-composer and formed a group with Mathieu Chédid. Her own musical career was cut short by a motor-bike accident, however. She studied Journalism and Art History at the École du Louvre and launched herself as a journalist, focusing increasingly on certain themes: art and culture, societal issues, women's rights, disability and religion. She wrote for Tribune juive and also contributed regularly to France-Soir, Paris-Match, Réforme and Témoignage chrétien.

She has participated in a number of international conferences in support of peace in the Middle-east, women's rights and at the United Nations.

== 2006-2012 ==
Olivia Cattan founded the "Paroles de femmes" ("Women's Words") organisation in order to promote women's rights. A gala event on 7 March 2007 attracted more than 800 women from all parts of society, and was conducted in the presence of artistic and political leaders including Nicolas Sarkozy. She co-wrote two feminist works: "Deux femmes en colère" ("Two angry women", 2006) and "La femme, la République et le Bon Dieu" (loosely: "Woman, the State and the Good Lord", 2008), and contributed to further collaborative publications on feminist themes. She created a "Pacte féminin" ("Female alliance") to develop social and political measures to improve the condition of women, as well as a "Charter of the rights of women" which was signed by political representatives and a large number of media personalities. However, her priorities were more practical than symbolic. Invited by a journalist to celebrate the removal of the title "Mademoiselle" ("Miss") from government forms she retorted that the word "Mademoiselle" had never bothered her, pointing to a poll that had found its usage ranked bottom in a list of women's concerns, troubling just 5% as against the 84% calling for equal pay.

She participated in the Grandes Gueules (loosely "Big Mouths") radio discussion show and started a series monthly radio broadcasts on Judaïques FM, a Jewish local radio service in Paris, using for her talks the title "Paroles de femmes", and dealing with feminist themes. She created a course module entitled "l’Égalité des sexes et de lutte contre toutes les discriminations" ("Gender equality and the fight against all forms of discrimination") for use in educational establishments, and she also engaged on the theme in detention centres for adolescents identified as having committed rapes. In May 2009 Olivia Cattan received an Ordre des Palmes Académiques award, for her "preventive work" in schools, from the Minister for Education, Xavier Darcos.

She launched the idea of "Maisons citoyennes" ("[Female] citizens' homes"), intended for homeless women, notably single mothers and/or victims of violence. The initiative was publicised using a "cine-clip" featuring the celebrity authors and thespians Lara Fabian, Fiona Gélin, Bruno Wolkowitch and Marek Halter, all dressed as though homeless, secured public awareness for the project. Monica Bellucci became "Ambassador - Paroles de femmes" and supported development of the project in France and in Italy. A second "cine-clip" featuring Emmanuelle Béart highlighted the growing precariousness of women's lives.

Other initiatives included the annual "Women's night" ("La nuit des femmes") television talk show on France 3 each 8 March to celebrate women, and the album "Libres de chanter, Paroles de femmes", produced with popular performers Liane Foly, Véronique Sanson, Amel Bent, Nolwenn Leroy and Shym, designed to raise further the profiles of the issues she most cares about.

In 2012, as part of his successful campaign for the presidency, François Hollande invited her to become a member of his "Committee for the Rights of Women".

== 2012-2014 ==
When her son was 4 or 5 (sources differ) Olivia Cattan discovered that her son was autistic. She set aside her career as a journalist and other projects in order to head for the Feuerstein Center in Jerusalem in order to obtain better care for her boy. After a month of intensive educational stimulation her son escaped his Mutism and made further progress week by week. After two years mother and son returned to France: for the next two years Cattan was able to work as a specialist teaching auxiliary at her son's school.

"Il y a une telle trouille de l'autisme ici! De la peur, de la méconnaissance, aucune médiatisation positive… Ils sont 600 000, autant qu'il y a d'élus politiques dans ce pays… et on ne les voit nulle part!"
Olivia Cattan, February, 2014
"There is such denial about autism here! Through fear, ignorance, lack of positive media coverage .... There are 600,000 people with Autism, which is around the same number that we have elected to political office ... and they all just run away from the subject."

The experienced awakened her campaigning energies afresh. In 2011 she published a public plea in the news magazine L'Express under the heart rending headline "Dis-maman, c’est quand qu’on va à l’école?" (loosely: "Hey, Mum. When do I get to go to school?). The statement was signed by numerous high-profile stars of screen and stage, including Jean Dujardin, Sandrine Bonnaire, Francis Perrin and Thomas Dutronc. Through "Paroles de femmes" she organised a meeting at the National Assembly (French parliament) successfully to oppose "Amendment 274 to the Autism Law" which had been proposed by a socialist assembly member. (The proposal involved excluding autistic children from mainstream education.) She widened the campaign by establishing "SOS autisme", to bring together families with a "different" child. In March 2012 she was honoured with the "Medal of the Public Good" for her campaigning work on behalf of disadvantaged women and autism sufferers.

Olivia Cattan is on record with the view that France is forty years behind neighbouring countries - notably Italy - in its approach to Autism. She continues to apply her considerable expertise of feminist issues and autism to her work as a campaigning journalist.
