= Sick role =

Medical sociology

Sick role is a term used in medical sociology regarding sickness and the rights and obligations of the affected. It is a concept created by American sociologist Talcott Parsons in 1951. The sick role fell out of favour in the 1990s replaced by social constructist theories.

== Concept ==
Parsons was a functionalist sociologist, who argued that being sick means that the sufferer enters a role of 'sanctioned deviance'. This is because, from a functionalist perspective, a sick individual is not a productive member of society. The patterns of sickness are often caused by persistent pain which helps to support their attitude of not wanting to take positive action to get better. Therefore this deviance needs to be policed, which is the role of the medical profession. Generally, Parsons argued that the best way to understand illness sociologically is to view it as a form of deviance which disturbs the social function of the society.

The general idea is that the individual who has fallen ill is not only physically sick, but now adheres to the specifically patterned social role of being sick. ‘Being Sick’ is not simply a ‘state of fact’ or ‘condition’, it contains within itself customary rights and obligations based on the social norms that surround it. The theory outlined two rights of a sick person and two obligations:

- Rights:
  - The sick person is exempt from normal social roles
  - The sick person is not responsible for their condition
- Obligations:
  - The sick person should try to get well
  - The sick person should seek technically competent help and cooperate with the medical professional(s)

There are three versions of sick role:

1. Conditional, wherein both rights and duties apply
2. Unconditionally legitimate - wherein obligations may not apply (the terminally ill are not obligated to try to get well)
3. Illegitimate role: condition that is stigmatized by others (wherein rights do not apply as the sick person is blamed for their condition)

== Criticisms ==
Critics of Parsons and the functionalist perspective point to different flaws they see with his argument. The model assumes that the individual voluntarily accepts the sick role, and ignores that the individual may not comply with expectations of the sick role, may not give up social obligations, may resist dependency, and may avoid the public sick role, particularly if their illness is stigmatized. The model also blames the sick, where “rights” do not always apply.

The sick role fell out of favour in the 1990s, with alternatives conceptualisations in terms of labeling theory viewing illness as a social construction to label socially deviant as inferior, with the medical system and physicians used as a means of control. Burnham argues that this rejection was combined with an explicit or implicit rejection of the idea unconscious (replaced with cognitive-behavioral theories) together with an explicit or implicit adoption of a Marxist perspective that disease was caused by economic circumstances.

== See also ==
- e-Patient
