= Structural pluralism =

Structural pluralism is "the potential for political competition in communities". The degree of structural pluralism is used to examine how societies are structured, and specifically is a way to explain coverage differences in media markets. Structural pluralism is studied in philosophical, sociological and communication literature.

Structural pluralism is what makes civic community a unique form of civil society (Morton, 2000). Structural pluralism represents the extent to which the community has an open and inclusive structure that permits minority voices and opinions to be heard when citizens and citizen groups are addressing community problems (Young, 1999).

Communities are discussed in terms of having common institutions, such as governing or other political bodies, religious, educational and economic institutions. These bodies or institutions help to maintain the social order within the community.

This concept comes from the field of sociology, but prior to that, stems from writings by Hegel (1821) on civic society. This comes also from the functionalist writings of Émile Durkheim and Herbert Spencer (Hindman, 1999).

Durkheim writes that there are two organizing principle types of societies, that most like the premodern communities, called mechanical solidarity in which ethnic and extended families were central; and that called organic solidarity which examines the relationships of interdependence based on other components, such as work, and social organizations (Durkheim, 1933). These are equated to today's rural and urban societies respectively.

== In journalism ==
Olien, Donohue and Tichenor (1978; Tichenor, Olien, & Donohue, 1980) helped to fold this concept into the communication discipline when they noted that structural pluralism has an effect on the way in which news is presented. Through several studies and publications, they built a model of structural pluralism, and later showed how power relationships work through a systems approach (Donohue, Olien, & Tichenor, 1985; Tichenor, Olien, & Donohue, 1980).

As media are typically supportive of the social system and institutions, as well as dependent upon them for gaining access to and gathering material that will be useful to the public, they often reflect the power structure of the community. Movements, groups or discussions that are critical of the social structure are often excluded from newspapers in communities where there is a strongly centralized power structure. An example of such a community would be a town in which a significant portion of adults are employed by one business or industry. Criticism of this business or industry may erode the faith of community members in it and lead to social unrest.

Initially the work of the Olien, Tichenor and Donohue camp allowed us to see how diversity in communities is reflected in the reporting style of news organizations. Conflict within communities is more often reported in larger and less homogeneous areas.

However, prior to the Olien, Tichenor, Donohue writings came those of Breed (1958) and Paletz, Reichert and McIntyre (1971). In their original pieces, the lack of criticism by the press on central powerholders was discussed.

Other studies of the impact of structural pluralism on journalism have looked shown that women are more often represented in areas that are more ethnically diverse (Armstrong, 2002); that newspapers in more diverse communities will be less likely to ignore protest stories or report them in an abbreviated fashion (Stein, et al., 2003); and others.

Structural pluralism has been discussed in law journals as a paradigmatic shift regarding the privatization of government entities (Roberts, 2001).

== See also ==
- Freedom of the press
- Cultural diversity
