= Peter Conrad (sociologist) =

American sociologist (1945–2024)

- Born: 12 April 1945
- Died: 3 March 2024 (aged 78); Lincoln, Massachusetts, US

Academic background
- Education: State University of New York at Buffalo; Northeastern University; Boston University

Academic work
- Discipline: sociology
- Sub-discipline: medical sociology
- Institutions: Brandeis University; Suffolk University; Drake University
- Notable works: Sociology of Health and Illness: Critical Perspectives

Peter Conrad (1945–2024) was an American medical sociologist who has researched and published on numerous topics including ADHD, the medicalization of deviance, the experience of illness, wellness in the workplace, genetics in the news, and biomedical enhancements.

== Biography ==
He was a member of the faculty at Brandeis University since 1979 and after 1993 was the Harry Coplan Professor of Social Sciences. He received his B.A. in sociology at State University of New York at Buffalo (1967), M.A. from Northeastern University (1970) and Ph.D. in sociology from Boston University in 1976. Prior to Brandeis, he taught at Suffolk University in Boston, Massachusetts (1971–1975) and Drake University in Des Moines, Iowa (1975–1978). At Brandeis he served as chair of the Department of Sociology for nine years and since 2002 as chair of the interdisciplinary program "Health: Science, Society and Policy" (HSSP). He also was a visiting professor at New York University, Gadjah Mada University (Yogyakarta, Indonesia), University of London, Royal Holloway, and Queen's University Belfast (Northern Ireland).

== Personal life ==
He lived in Lincoln, Massachusetts, with his wife, Dr. Libby Bradshaw. They had two children.

== Published works ==
Conrad was the author of over one hundred articles and chapters and a dozen books, including Identifying Hyperactive Children: The Medicalization of Deviant Behavior (1975, 2004), Deviance and Medicalization: From Badness to Sickness (with Joseph W. Schneider, 1980, 1992), Having Epilepsy: The Experience and Control of Illness (1983) and The Medicalization of Society: On the Transformation of Human Conditions into Treatable Disorders (2007). He also edited or co-edited numerous volumes, including Handbook of Medical Sociology, 5th edition (2000) and eight editions of Sociology of Health and Illness: Critical Perspectives (1981–2009), a widely used text for undergraduates.

== Awards ==
He received numerous academic honors including the Charles Horton Cooley Award (1981) for Deviance and Medicalization, a Distinguished Fulbright Fellowship (1997), the Leo G. Reeder Award (2004) from the American Sociological Association for "distinguished contributions to medical sociology", and the Lee Founder's Award (2007) "made in recognition of significant achievements that, over a distinguished career, have demonstrated continuing devotion to the ideals of the founders of the Society for the Study of Social Problems and especially to the humanist tradition of Alfred McClung Lee and Elizabeth Briant Lee."
