= Hyperkinetic disorder =

Former neurodevelopmental disorder resembling severe ADHD

- Specialty: Psychiatry
- Symptoms: Inattention, hyperactivity, impulsivity

Hyperkinetic disorder was a neuropsychiatric condition that was thought to emerge in early childhood. Its features included an enduring pattern of severe, developmentally-inappropriate symptoms of inattention, hyperactivity, and impulsivity across different settings (e.g., home and school) that significantly impair academic, social, and work performance. It was classified in the World Health Organization's ICD-10 and was roughly similar to the "combined presentation" of attention-deficit/hyperactivity disorder in the American Psychiatric Association's DSM-5. However, in the ICD-11 the entry for hyperkinetic disorder no longer exists and is replaced by attention deficit hyperactivity disorder.

== Symptoms ==
People which used to be classified as hyperkinetic displayed disorganized, poorly controlled and excessive activity; they were perceived as lacking perseverance in tasks involving thought and attention, and tending to move from one activity to the next without completing any of them. They were described as accident-prone, reckless, and impulsive, and might thoughtlessly (rather than defiantly) break rules. Cognitive impairment, delayed language and retarded motor development were more common in this group than in the general population, and they might have experienced low self-esteem and engaged in antisocial behavior as a consequence of the disorder.

While children described as hyperkinetic were commonly incautious and unreserved with adults, they were at times isolated from, and unpopular with other children.

== Diagnosis ==
Though the American Psychiatric Association's criteria for Attention-Deficit/Hyperactivity Disorder (ADHD), and the World Health Organization's criteria for hyperkinetic disorder each list a very similar set of 18 symptoms, the differing rules governing diagnosis meant that hyperkinetic disorder featured greater impairment and more impulse-control difficulties than typical ADHD, and it most resembled a severe case of ADHD combined type.

Unlike ADHD, a diagnosis of hyperkinetic disorder required that the clinician directly observed the symptoms (rather than relying only on parent and teacher reports), that onset must have been by age 6 not 7; and that at least six inattention, three hyperactivity and one impulsivity symptom be present in two or more settings. While ADHD may exist comorbid with (in the presence of) mania or a depressive or anxiety disorder, the presence of one of these rules out a diagnosis of hyperkinetic disorder. Most cases of hyperkinetic disorder appear to have met the broader criteria of ADHD.

Hyperkinetic disorder was also sometimes comorbid with conduct disorder, in which case the diagnosis was hyperkinetic conduct disorder.

== Epidemiology ==
The rate in school age children was thought to be about 1.5%, compared with an estimated 5.3% for ADHD.

== Treatment ==
Once the patient and family had been educated about the nature, management and treatment of the disorder and a decision has been made to treat, the European ADHD Guidelines group recommended medication rather than behavioral training as the first treatment approach; and the UK's National Institute for Health and Clinical Excellence recommended medication as first line treatment for those with hyperkinesis/severe ADHD, and the provision of group parent-training in all cases of ADHD.

== History ==
Beforehand, the terminology "brain damage" was used due the studies conducted in survivors of the epidemic of encephalitis lethargica from 1917 to 1918 and the pandemic of influenza from 1919 to 1920.

The first description of the hyperkinetic disorder was made by Kramer and Pollnow during the 1930s. The disorder was very similar to Constantin von Economo description of encephalitis lethargica. It differed from ADHD for having severe symptomatology and with frequent recovery associated with seizures. Their description became popular in Europe and was included in the World Health Organization’s international classification of disease.

Maurice Laufer and Eric Denhoff studied hyperactive children at Emma Pendleton Bradley Home. Their studies were published in 1957, showing that only one third of their patients had brain damage, debunking once and for all the term "minimal brain damage" and replacing it with "minimal brain dysfunction." Then, they coined a new terminology, "hyperkinetic impulse disorder," that was applicable to far more children than the previous one.

On October 4, 1957, during the Cold War, the Soviet Union successfully launched into orbit the first artificial satellite, Sputnik 1, thus starting the race to the moon. The event came as a great shock to the United States, and there was pressure to train new scientists, engineers and astronauts. There was a reform on the education system, where the progressive education ideas were changed in 1958 to the National Defense Education Act (NDEA). Education became more rigid and in fixed learning environments. The broader definition of hyperkinetic impulse disorder led to its identification in many schools.

== See also ==
- Attention-deficit/hyperactivity disorder (ADHD)
- Medicalization
- Medical sociology
