= Left Coast Press =

American publisher

Left Coast Press was an independent, scholarly publishing house specializing in social sciences and humanities. Based in Walnut Creek, California, and distributed globally, the company published approximately 500 books between 2005 and 2016 before the company was purchased by Routledge, who rebranded them as Routledge books. The company also published 13 scholarly journals before its journals division was sold in 2012 to Maney Publishing, now part of Taylor & Francis.

Founded by Mitchell Allen, formerly Executive Editor at Sage Publications and Publisher of AltaMira Press, and Ariadne Prater, an administrator at University of California Berkeley, the company focused on publishing anthropology, archaeology, museum studies, and qualitative methods. Within these fields, products included research monographs, edited collections, reference books, textbooks, scholarly comic books, supplemental texts, DVDs, and scholarly journals. Almost all Left Coast titles were available both in paper and ebook form. Distributors included University of Chicago Press (US), University of Arizona Press (US), University of British Columbia Press (Canada), Berg Publishers (Europe), Eurospan (Europe), Footprint Books (Australia).

An unrelated nt.html Left Coast Press, which produces hand printed books, operates in Oakland, California, and is directed by Dorothy Yule.

== Archaeology ==
Left Coast's first season in 2005 included books by archaeologists Brian Fagan, Thomas King, and David Whitley. In 2007, Left Coast became publisher for the UCL Institute of Archaeology, for which they published and distributed 67 titles by 2016. Left Coast also published for the World Archaeological Congress (WAC), including the long-standing One World Archaeology series, a series of research handbooks, and a series on indigenous peoples and archaeology. The largest of Left Coast's lists of titles, the archaeology program had additional series on heritage tourism, cultural resources management, rock art research, historical archaeology, cultural property law, and historical ecology. Left Coast resurrected the defunct Academic Press book series, reissuing such New Archaeology titles as Kent Flannery’s Early Mesoamerican Village, Linda Cordell's Archaeology of the Southwest, and Jane Buikstra’s Bioarchaeology. Among the archaeologists publishing with the press were Paul Bahn, Jeremy Sabloff, Thomas King, Sarah Milledge Nelson, Alice Beck Kehoe, Deborah Pearsall, Lewis Binford, David Lewis-Williams, Ian Hodder, and Michael Shanks.

Indigenous archaeology and cultural resources management were two focuses of the Left Coast program. Left Coast was among the sponsoring organizations for the Intellectual Property Issues in Cultural Heritage Project of Simon Fraser University. Among the projects in archaeology was the first book on Black Feminist Archaeology (Battle-Baptiste), descriptions of the excavations at Catalhoyuk written by journalist Michael Balter and another by the site's guard Sadrettin Dural, and a book of archaeological quotations. Left Coast also preserved in print the 7th edition of the oldest archaeological field methods textbook, originally written by Robert Heiser in 1949.

== Anthropology ==
Left Coast published in many of the areas of anthropology, including cultural anthropology, archaeology, and biological anthropology. Its list focused on applied aspects of the field, particularly medical anthropology and business anthropology, in which the publisher had ongoing series. Central to the business anthropology program was the first reference volume on the topic, Handbook of Anthropology in Business (Denny and Sunderland) in 2014. Another focus in anthropology was in Native American and indigenous studies, including books by indigenous scholars such as Gary White Deer, Joe Watkins, Sonya Atalay, and Roger Echo-Hawk.

The company brought to press posthumously a lost work by anthropologist Leslie White, Modern Capitalist Culture, begun in 1959 but not published until 2008. Left Coast's publisher, Mitchell Allen, received an Executive Director's Award of the American Anthropological Association in 2014 for the Press's work in anthropology.

== Museum Studies ==
Left Coast partnered with several organizations to produce works of practical interest to museum professionals: the Museum Education Roundtable, the PEW Center for Arts and Heritage, Te Papa Museum, and the Exploratorium. Authors in the museum research and practice world who published works with the press included Beverly Serrell, Peter Samis, Leslie Bedford, Kathleen MacLean, and Hugh Genoways. John H. Falk and Lynne Dierking's book The Museum Experience was added to the Left Coast list in 2011 and a new edition The Museum Experience Revisited published in 2012. Explorations of visitor experience, interpretive planning, diverse audiences, and career planning were included in the Left Coast titles.

== Qualitative Methods ==
Left Coast was the publisher for the International Congress on Qualitative Inquiry, publishing both its journal and an annual book series out of the Congresses. Founder of the Congress, Norman K. Denzin, was a frequent contributor to the Left Coast list as an editor and author, including his Qualitative Manifesto and a set of 4 books on Native Americans treatment by American culture.

Janice Morse edited two textbook series for Left Coast, which also published a series based out of the International Institute for Qualitative Methodology at the University of Alberta, founded by Morse. She also wrote books on qualitative health research and research design for the Left Coast list.

The newly developed subfield of autoethnography was another element of the qualitative methods list, including the Handbook of Autoethnography, Carolyn Ellis’s texts Revision and Evocative Autoethnography (with Arthur Bochner), and the Writing Lives series.

Max van Manen, moved his six phenomenology titles to Left Coast in 2015, where he then launched the Phenomenology of Practice series. Oral history became another focus of the research methods collection, including the Community Oral History Toolkit and the Practicing Oral History series, edited by Nancy MacKay. Other qualitative methods authors at Left Coast included Yvonna Lincoln, Laurel Richardson, Harry Wolcott, Johnny Saldaña, Jean Clandinin, and Bud Goodall. Left Coast books won book awards from the International Congress for Qualitative Inquiry in five of first seven years the award was presented.

== Other Strands of Publication ==
Left Coast produced books in other social science fields including:

- Paulo Friere's Pedagogy of Solidarity
- WEB DuBois's Encyclopedia of the Negro prospectus, reissued
- Sociologist Richard Gelles's policy work The Third Lie
- John H. Stanfield II's Black Reflective Sociology

Seven books on cultural studies, communication, advertising, tourism, and writing by Arthur Asa Berger

== Journals ==
Beginning in 2006, after taking over publication of the 30-year old Journal of Museum Education, Left Coast launched a pair of new professional journals for the museum field, first with Museums & Social Issues (2006), then Museum History Journal (2008).

In 2009, the Society for California Archaeology chose Left Coast as publisher of a new journal for their organization, California Archaeology. Left Coast launched three new journals for archaeologists: Heritage and Society (2008), Ethnoarchaeology (2009), and Journal of African Diaspora Archaeology and Heritage (2012). In addition, they secured agreement to assume publication of Kiva, a 75-year old journal of southwest archaeology sponsored by the Arizona Archaeological and Historical Society, Lithic Technology, a 35-year old journal of lithics studies, and Ñawpa Pacha, a 30-year old journal of Andean archaeology sponsored by the Institute of Andean Studies.

Left Coast partnered with the International Congress for Qualitative Inquiry to create the International Review of Qualitative Inquiry in 2008 and launched a second qualitative journal, Qualitative Communication Research (now Departures in Critical Qualitative Research, University of California Press) in 2012.

In 2012, the Left Coast list of journals was transferred to Maney Publishing in the United Kingdom, except for the qualitative journals, which were transferred to University of California Press. Maney was purchased by Taylor & Francis in 2015, including the Left Coast journals.
