= Pedagogical relation =

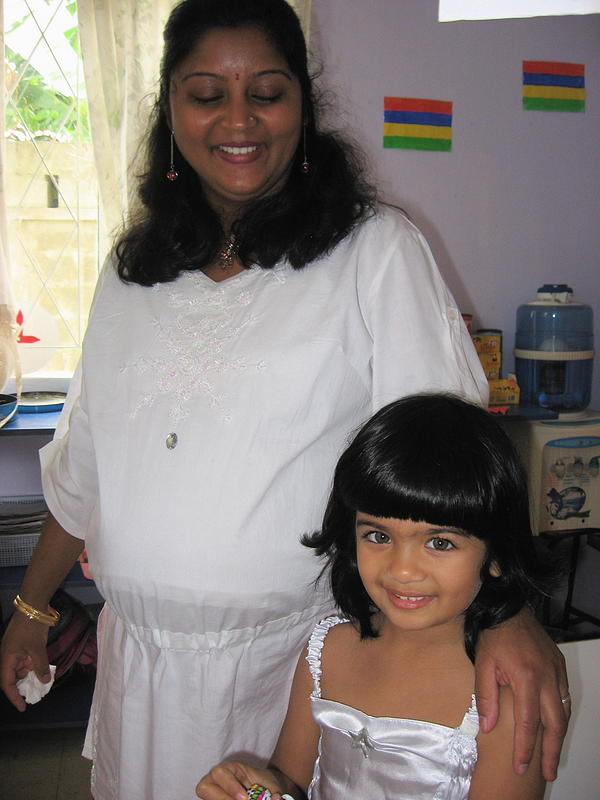
A child and her teacher in Mauritius. The teacher's attentiveness to the child and the child's outward gaze into what is before her exemplify the interpersonal dynamics of the pedagogical relation.

The pedagogical relation refers to special kind of personal relationship between adult and child or adult or student for the sake of the child or student. The pedagogical relation is described by Hermann Nohl, Klaus Mollenhauer, and others in the Northern European human science pedagogical tradition. It has been discussed more recently in English by Max van Manen, Norm Friesen, Tone Saevi and others.

In the pedagogical relation, adult and child encounter each other in ways that are different from other relationships (e.g., friendship)

- In the pedagogical relation the adult is directed toward the child. The relation is asymmetrical.. The adult is "there" for the child in a way that the child is not "there" for the adult.
- In the pedagogical relation the adult wants or intends both what is good for the child in the present and in the future. This relationship is oriented to what the child or young person may become (without trying to predetermine it), but without ignoring what is important for the child in the present. These two, present needs and the likely requirements of the future, exist in constant tension this relation.
- The pedagogical relation comes to an end. The child grows up and the asymmetry of the relation dissolves. As Klaus Mollenhauer explains, "upbringing comes to an end when the child no longer needs to be "called" to self-activity, but instead has the wherewithal to educate himself."
- In the pedagogical relation the adult is tactful. It is not about following rules and guidelines, but rather, about acting and also not acting according to what is appropriate for both the present and the future of a specific child in question.
- In the pedagogical relation, the adult mediates the relationship of the child with the world. This can happen by protecting the child from certain aspects of the world; it often happens by simplifying certain aspects of the world for the child, by directing the child's attention through gestures of pointing and guiding.

In a text from 1933, educationist Herman Nohl describes the pedagogical relation as a relationship between a particular stance of the educator in relationship to the one being educated (educand):

This basic stance … is decisively characterized by the fact that its perspective is unconditionally that of the educand. This means that its task is not to draw the child towards … specific, predetermined, objective goals that it might see … [in] the state, the church, the law, the economy, and also not of a [political] party or worldview. Instead, it sees its goal in the subject and his/her physical and personal realization or unfolding (körperlich-geistige Entfaltung). That this child here comes to his life’s purpose (Lebensziel), that is [its] … autonomous and inalienable task. (p. 152)

— Herman Nohl

The pedagogical relation, finally, has as its interest not necessarily the "success" of the student, but rather their "subjectivation"--their becoming a subject, a person, something that is to be pursued as an end in itself.
