= PoliceActivity =

YouTube channel

YouTube information
- Channel: @PoliceActivity
- Years active: 2016–present
- Genre: Education
- Subscribers: 6.9 million
- Views: 3.25 billion

PoliceActivity is a YouTube channel that was created in 2016. It specializes in collecting and uploading body camera footage from US law enforcement agencies. The channel has nearly 7 million subscribers.

Reportedly, the channel is one of the most popular police bodycam-orientered channels on YouTube.

== History ==
The channel was registered on January 17, 2016, in the United States. As of June 21, 2026, PoliceActivity uploaded around 2.6k videos, garnering over 3 billion views. It had over 137 million views in 2017. PoliceActivity uploaded its first video on January 20, 2016. The channel's content primarily consists of body camera footage from American police officers responding to emergencies. Reportedly, the purpose of the channel is to educate viewers about the dangers of working as an on-duty police officer. The channel is not affiliated with any police agency and the identity of its owner is unknown.

According to Ojumoola Daniel, all videos are unedited and unfiltered. They either consist of routine police duties such as traffic stops or dangerous encounters with suspects. PoliceActivity shows both positive and concerning police interactions, allowing the viewers to form their own opinions on the situations. PoliceActivity, along with other channels, obtain bodycam footage for upload by requesting it from various police departments. Sociologist Norman K. Denzin said that PoliceActivity can be considered one of the most popular police bodycam channels on YouTube.

== Videos ==
Most videos on PoliceActivity have short descriptions of the incidents that provide context of the situation, the paragraphs range from two hundred to six hundred words. Sometimes, the channel copies the text from local news affiliates of ABC, CBS, and Fox News with little changes and no credit. Analysis by CanLII showed that each description influenced the discussions of the channel's audience and their interpretations of the incidents.

Examples of the channel's videos include Bodycam Video Shows Knife-Wielding Man Shot by Ohio Policeman, which grew from an initial 6 million views to more than 9 million views. PoliceActivity's most popular video is Woman With Child in Car Rams Multiple People & Police Cars While Trying to Avoid Arrest which was uploaded on July 20, 2022. It has over 46 million views. PoliceActivity has uploaded a number of bodycam videos that were widely shared online, most of them filmed in Oklahoma.
