= Human Science Pedagogy =

Discipline of pedagogical science

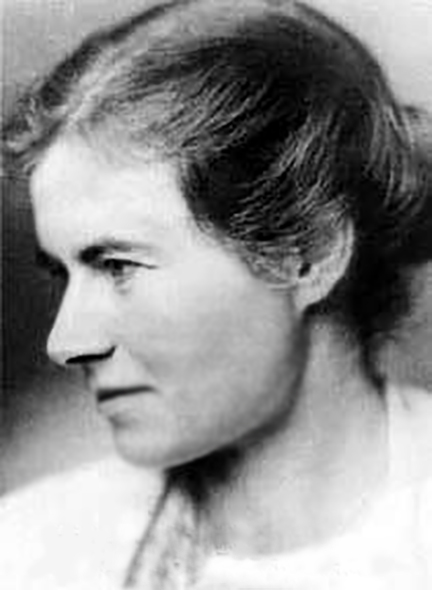
Elisabeth Blochmann (1892-1972), human science pedagogue, student of Herman Nohl and life-long correspondent with Martin Heidegger.

Human Science Pedagogy is the branch of the Human science concerned with education, upbringing, teaching and individual growth or formation (Bildung). It is oriented to teaching and learning practice, to the relational experience of the teacher and student, to questions of ethics, history and to what it is to be human. It was the dominant approach to educational scholarship teacher education, and the philosophy of education, and in Germany from the Weimar Era to the late 1960s. Human Science Pedagogy is based on the educational work of Friedrich Schleiermacher, which was integrated by Wilhelm Dilthey into his conception of a multidisciplinary human science. It was subsequently consolidated by Herman Nohl and developed further by Otto Friedrich Bollnow, Theodore Litt, Jakob Muth and others. Human science pedagogy has endured in the work of Klaus Mollenhauer, Max van Manen and other recent and contemporary scholars.

== Common themes ==
There are a number of common themes in this approach:

1. It begins by affirming the primacy and the dignity of pedagogical practice. "Originally, parents undertook education, and as is commonly acknowledged, they did so without reference to a 'theory,'" as Schleiermacher points out. Practice exists independently from theory, and theory unavoidably comes later. Theory has much to learn from practice as it occurs today and has taken place in the past.
2. It is develops from Schleiermacher's key question for education: "What does the older generation actually want of [or with] the younger?" This means that education and upbringing is an ethical and collective (or "political") questions, that ask after what we currently do and what we should do. It also means that education is part of our common everyday life, and that it is in this sense cultural.
3. Education is therefore a question of the lived, experienced relation of the teacher or adult and student or child.
4. Hope and trust, shared by both educator and child, are fundamental to this relation. Hope and trust shared in a broader community (e.g. in a classroom or school) is known as the pedagogical atmosphere.
5. The teacher works towards this atmosphere and establishment of pedagogical relations through the exercise of pedagogical tact.
6. This hope and trust are subject to unexpected disruptions: In the life of the child, in the work of the teacher (through errors or failure), or in the world shared by student and teacher (e.g. school life). These cannot be prepared for directly, but their impact on students and children can be lessened through the cultivation of the pedagogical relation, the pedagogical atmosphere and the educator's pedagogical tact.
