= Autoethnography =

Research method using personal experience

Autoethnography is a form of ethnographic research in which a researcher connects personal experiences to wider cultural, political, and social meanings and understandings. It is considered a form of qualitative and arts-based research.

Autoethnography has been used across various disciplines, including anthropology, arts education, communication studies, education, educational administration, English literature, ethnic studies, gender studies, history, human resource development, marketing, music therapy, nursing, organizational behavior, paramedicine, performance studies, physiotherapy, psychology, social work, sociology, and theology and religious studies.

== Definitions ==
Historically, researchers have had trouble reaching a consensus regarding the definition of autoethnography. Some scholars situate autoethnography within the family of narrative methods, while others place it within the ethnographic tradition. However, it generally refers to research that involves critical observation of an individual's lived experiences and connecting those experiences to broader cultural, political, and social concepts.

Autoethnography can refer to research in which a researcher reflexively studies a group they belong to or their subjective experience. In the 1970s, autoethnography was more narrowly defined as "insider ethnography", referring to studies of the (culture of) a group of which the researcher is a member.

According to Adams et al., autoethnography:

1. uses a researcher's personal experience to describe and critique cultural beliefs, practices, and experiences;
2. acknowledges and values a researcher's relationships with others;
3. uses deep and careful self-reflection—typically referred to as “reflexivity”—to name and interrogate the intersections between self and society, the particular and the general, the personal and the political;
4. shows people in the process of figuring out what to do, how to live, and the meaning of their struggles;
5. balances intellectual and methodological rigor, emotion, and creativity; and
6. strives for social justice and to make life better.

Bochner and Ellis have also defined autoethnography as "an autobiographical genre of writing and research that displays multiple layers of consciousness, connecting the personal to the cultural." They further indicate that autoethnography is typically written in first-person and can "appear in a variety of forms," such as "short stories, poetry, fiction, novels, photographic essays, personal essays, journals, fragmented and layered writing, and social science prose."

== History ==
=== Mid-1800s ===
Anthropologists began conducting ethnographic research in the mid-1800s to study the cultures of people they deemed "exotic" and/or "primitive." Typically, these early ethnographers aimed to merely observe and write "objective" accounts of these groups to provide readers with a better understanding of various cultures. They also "recognized and wrestled with questions of how to render textual accounts that would provide clear, accurate, rich descriptions of cultural practices of others" and "were concerned with offering valid, reliable, and objective interpretations in their writings."

=== Early- to mid-1900s ===
In the early to mid 1900s, it became clear that observation and fieldwork interfered with the cultural groups' natural and typical behaviors. Additionally, researchers realized the role they play in analyzing others' behaviors. As such, "serious questions arose about the possibility and legitimacy of offering purely objective accounts of cultural practices, traditions, symbols, meanings, premises, rituals, rules, and other social engagements."

To help combat potential issues of validity, ethnographers began using what Gilbert Ryle refers to as thick description: a description of human social behavior in which the writer-researcher describes the behavior and provides "commentary on, context for, and interpretation of these behaviors into the text." By doing so, the researcher aims to "evoke a cultural scene vividly, in detail, and with care," so readers can understand and attempt to interpret the scene for themselves, much like in more traditional research methods.

A few ethnographers, especially those related to the Chicago school, began incorporating aspects of autoethnography into their work, such as narrated life histories. While they created more lifelike representations of their subjects than their predecessors, these researchers often "romanticized the subject" by creating narratives with "the three stages of the classic morality tale: being in a state of grace, being seduced by evil and falling from grace, and finally achieving redemption through suffering." Such researchers include Robert Parks, Nels Anderson, Everett Hughes, and Fred Davis.

During this time period, new theoretical constructs, such as feminism, began to emerge, and with them grew qualitative research. However, researchers were trying to "fit the classical traditional model of internal and external validity to constructionist and interactionist conceptions of the research act."

=== 1970s ===
With the growth of qualitative research from the mid-1900s, "a few scholars were urging thicker descriptions, giving more attention to concrete details of everyday life, renouncing the ethics and artificiality of experimental studies, and complaining about the obscurity of jargon and technical language, ... but social scientists, for the most part, weren't all that concerned about the researcher's location in the text, the capacity of language to accurately represent reality, or the need for researcher reflexivity."

The term autoethnography was first used in 1975 when Karl G. Heider connected individuals' personal experiences to larger, cultural beliefs and traditions. In Heider's case, the individual self referred to the people he was studying rather than himself. Because the people he studied were providing their personal accounts and experiences, Heider considered the work autoethnographic.

Later in the 1970s, researchers began more clearly stating their positionality and indicating how their mere presence altered the behaviors of the groups they studied. Further, researchers distinguished between people who researched groups of which they were a part (i.e., cultural insiders) and those who researched groups of which they were not a part (i.e., cultural outsiders). At this point, the term autoethnography began to refer to forms of ethnography in which the researcher is a cultural insider.

Walter Goldschmidt proposed that all ethnography is, in some way, autobiographical, because "ethnographic representations privilege personal beliefs, perspectives, and observations." As an anthropologist, David Hayano was interested in the role that an individual's own identity had in their research. Unlike more traditional research methods, Hayano believed there was value in a researcher "conducting and writing ethnographies of their own people."

While researchers recognized the part they played in understanding a group of people, none focused explicitly on the "inclusion and importance of personal experience in research."

=== 1980s ===
More generally in the 1980s, researchers began questioning and critiquing the role of the researcher, especially in social sciences. Multiple researchers aimed to make "research and writing more reflexive and called into question the issues of gender, class, and race." As a result of these concerns, researchers purposefully inserted themselves as characters in the ethnographic narrative as a way of navigating the problem of researcher interference. Additionally, some of the predmoninant ways of understanding truth were eroded, and "[i]ssues such as validity, reliability, and objectivity ... were once again problematic. Pattern and interpretive theories, as opposed to causal linear theories, were now more common as writers continued to challenge older models of truth and meaning."

In 1988, John Van Maanen noted three predominant ways ethnographers write about culture:

1. Realist Tales, in which the researcher uses a "dispassionate, third-person voice" and attempts to provide an "accurate" and "objective" account of the group studied without provider much researcher response;
2. Confessional Tales, which include the researchers' "highly personalized styles" and responses to the observed data; and
3. Impressionist Tales, in which the researcher uses first-person to craft a "tightly focused, vibrant, exact, but necessarily imaginative rendering of fieldwork."

At the end of the 1980s, scholars began to apply the term autoethnography to work that used confessional and impressionist forms as they recognized that "the richness of cultural lives and life practices of others cannot be fully captured or evoked in purely objective or descriptive language."

=== 1990s to present ===
In the early- to mid-1990s, researchers aimed to address the concerns raised in the previous decades regarding questions of legitimacy and reliability of ethnographic approaches. One way to do that was to directly place oneself into the research narrative, noting the positionality of the researcher. Here, the researcher could either insert themselves into the research narrative or increase participants' involvement in the research project, such as through participatory action research.

Autoethnography became more popular in the 1990s for ethnographers who aimed to use "personal experience and reflexivity to examine cultural experiences." Series such as Ethnographic Alternatives and the first Handbook of Qualitative Research were published to better explain the importance of autoethnographic use, and key texts focused specifically on autoethnography were published, including Carolyn Ellis's Investigating Subjectivity, Final Negotiations, The Ethnographic I, and Revision, as well as Art Bochner's Coming to Narrative. In 2013, Tony Adams, Stacy Holman Jones, and Carolyn Ellis co-edited the first edition of the Handbook of Autoethnography, first published in 2015; the second edition was published in 2022. In 2020, Adams and Andrew Herrmann started the Journal of Autoethnography with the University of California Press. In 2021, Marlen Harrison started The Autoethnographer, a literary and arts magazine. In 2023, Tony Adams launched the Certificate in Autoethnography program at Bradley University.

In the 2000s, major conferences began to regularly accept autoethnographic work, starting primarily with the International Congress of Qualitative Inquiry in 2005. Other conferences that foreground autoethnographic research include the International Symposium on Autoethnography and Narrative (formerly Doing Autoethnography), the International Conference of Autoethnography (formerly British Autoethnography), and Critical Autoethnography.

Today, ethnographers typically use a "kind of hybrid form of confessional-impressionist tale" that includes "performative, poetic, impressionistic, symbolic, and lyrical language" while also "focusing closely on the self-data inherent in confessional writing."

== Epistemological and theoretical basis ==
Autoethnography differs from ethnography in that autoethnography embraces and foregrounds the researcher's subjectivity rather than attempting to limit it as in empirical research. As Carolyn Ellis explains, "autoethnography overlaps art and science; it is part auto or self and part ethno or culture."Importantly, it is also "something different from both of them, greater than its parts." In other words, as Ellingson and Ellis put it, "whether we call a work an autoethnography or an ethnography depends as much on the claims made by authors as anything else."

In embracing personal thoughts, feelings, stories, and observations as a way of understanding the social context they are studying, autoethnographers are also shedding light on their total interaction with that setting by making their every emotion and thought visible to the reader. This is much the opposite of theory-driven, hypothesis-testing research methods that are based on the positivist epistemology. In this sense, Ellingson and Ellis see autoethnography as a social constructionist project that rejects the deep-rooted binary oppositions between the researcher and the researched, objectivity and subjectivity, process and product, self and others, art and science, and the personal and the political.

Autoethnographers, therefore, tend to reject the concept of social research as an objective and neutral knowledge produced by scientific methods, which can be characterized and achieved by detachment of the researcher from the researched. Autoethnography, in this regard, is a critical "response to the alienating effects on both researchers and audiences of impersonal, passionless, abstract claims of truth generated by such research practices and clothed in exclusionary scientific discourse." Deborah Reed-Danahay (1997) also argues that autoethnography is a postmodernist construct:

The concept of autoethnography...synthesizes both a postmodern ethnography, in which the realist conventions and objective observer position of standard ethnography have been called into question, and a postmodern autobiography, in which the notion of the coherent, individual self has been similarly called into question. The term has a double sense - referring either to the ethnography of one's own group or to autobiographical writing that has ethnographic interest. Thus, either a self- (auto-) ethnography or an autobiographical (auto-) ethnography can be signaled by "autoethnography.

== Process ==
As a method, autoethnography combines characteristics of autobiography and ethnography.

To form the autobiographical aspects of the autoethnography, the author will write retroactively and selectively about past experiences. Unlike other forms of research, the author typically did not live through such experiences solely to create a publishable document; rather, the experiences are assembled using hindsight. Additionally, authors may conduct formal or informal interviews and/or consult relevant texts (e.g., diaries or photographs) to help with recall. The experiences are tied together using literary elements "to create evocative and specific representations of the culture/cultural experience and to give audiences a sense of how being there in the experience feels."

Ethnography, on the other hand, involves observing and writing about culture. During the first stage, researchers will observe and interview individuals of the selected cultural group and take detailed fieldnotes. Ethnographers discover their findings through induction. That is, ethnographers do not go into the field looking for specific answers; rather, their observations, writing, and fieldnotes yield the findings. Such findings are conveyed to others through thick description so that readers may come to their own conclusions regarding the situation described.

Autoethnography uses aspects of autobiography (e.g., personal experiences and recall) and ethnography (e.g., interviews, observations, and fieldnotes) to create vivid descriptions that connect to the personal to the cultural.

== Types ==
Because autoethnography is a broad and ambiguous "category that encompasses a wide array of practices," autoethnographies "vary in their emphasis on the writing and research process (graphy), on culture (ethnos), and on self (auto)." More recently, autoethnography has been separated into two distinct subtypes: analytic and evocative. According to Ellingson and Ellis, "Analytic autoethnographers focus on developing theoretical explanations of broader social phenomena, whereas evocative autoethnographers focus on narrative presentations that open up conversations and evoke emotional responses."Scholars also discuss visual autoethnography, which incorporates imagery along with written analysis.

=== Analytic autoethnography ===
Analytic autoethnography focuses on "developing theoretical explanations of broader social phenomena" and aligns with more traditional forms of research that value "generalization, distanced analysis, and theory-building."

This form has five key features:

1. complete member researcher (CMR) status
2. analytic reflexivity
3. narrative visibility of the researcher's self
4. dialogue with informants beyond the self
5. commitment to theoretical analysis

First, in all forms of autoethnography, the researcher must be a member of the cultural group they are studying and thus, have CMR status. This cultural group may be loosely connected without knowledge of one another (e.g., people with disabilities) or tightly connected (e.g., members of a small church). CMR status helps the research "approximate the emotional stance of the people they study," thereby addressing some criticisms of ethnography. Like the evocative autoethnographer, the analytic autoethnographer "is personally engaged in a social group, setting, or culture as a full member and active participant." However, they "retains a distinct and highly visible identity as a self-aware scholar and social actor within the ethnographic text."

Two CMR status types are recognized: opportunistic and convert. Opportunistic CMRs exist as part of the cultural group they aim to study prior to deciding to research the group. To receive this insider status, the researcher "may be born into a group, thrown into a group by chance circumstance (e.g., illness), or have acquired intimate familiarity through occupational, recreational, or lifestyle participation." Conversely, convert CMRs "begin with a purely data-oriented research interest in the setting but become converted to complete immersion and membership during the course of the research." Here, a researcher will opt to study a cultural group, then become ingrained into that culture throughout the research process.

Second, when conducting analytic autoethnography, the researcher must utilize analytic reflexivity. That is, they must express their "awareness of their necessary connection to the research situation and hence their effects upon it," making themselves "visible, active, and reflexively engaged in the text."

Thirdly and similarly, the researcher should be visibly present throughout the narrative and "should illustrate analytic insights through recounting their own experiences and thoughts as well as those of others." Beyond this, analytic autoethnographers "should openly discuss changes in their beliefs and relationships over the course of fieldwork, thus vividly revealing themselves as people grappling with issues relevant to membership and participation in fluid rather than static social worlds."

Conversely, the fourth concept aims to prevent the text from "author saturation," which centers the author more than the culture being observed. While "analytic autoethnography is grounded in self-experience," it should "[reach] beyond it as well," perhaps including interviews with and/or observations of with others who are members of the culture studied. This connection to the culture moves the autoethnography beyond a mere autobiography or memoir.

Lastly, analytic autoethnography should commit to an analytic agenda. That is, the analytic autoethnography should not merely "document personal experience," "provide an 'insider's perspective,'" or "evoke emotional resonance with the reader." Rather, it should "use empirical data to gain insight into some broader set of social phenomena than those provided by the data themselves."

Although Leon Anderson conceptualized analytic autoethnography alongside evocative autoethnography, Anderson critiques the false dichotomy between analytic and evocative autoethnography in his chapter, "I Learn by Going: Autoethnographic Modes of Inquiry" (co-authored with Bonnie Glass-Coffin), the lead chapter in the first edition of the Handbook of Autoethnography.

=== Evocative autoethnography ===
Evocative autoethnography "focus[es] on narrative presentations that open up conversations and evoke emotional responses." According to Bochner and Ellis, the goal is for the readers to see themselves in the autoethnographer so they transform private troubles into public plight, making it powerful, comforting, dangerous, and culturally essential. Accounts are presented like novels or biographies and thus, fracture the boundaries that normally separate literature from social science.

=== Symbiotic autoethnography ===
Symbiotic autoethnography suggests a way of reconciling the differences in various types of autoethnography through suggesting an innovative symbiotic approach. The author uses the concept of 'symbiosis' in its broader sense to denote close interdependence and interrelation between its suggested seven attributes, including temporality, the researcher's omnipresence, evocative storytelling, interpretative analysis, a political (transformative) focus, reflexivity and polyvocality.

=== Auto-ethnographic design ===
Auto-ethnographic design is a materially-oriented practice that ties design research with expression. According to Schouwenberg and Kaethler, "There is a break here between the autoethnographic tradition and how it is taken up in design, where for the 'graphy' the act of reporting and reflection is replaced by creative production; design activates the knowledge component by directly engaging and altering the very world it seeks to make sense of". In contrast to other forms of design, auto-ethnographic designs are deeply personal and tend towards the artistic, using materiality as a way of understanding the self and communicating it. The hyphen that separates auto and ethnography represents the materiality that is needed to understand the self. It is critiqued for being excessively naval gazing.

=== Minor literature autoethnography ===
Minor literature autoethnography (MLA) is an experimental approach to qualitative social research proposed by De Jong (2014) in Always Becoming: (De-) (Re-)territorializing, . Drawing on Gilles Deleuze and Félix Guattari's concept of minor literature, the approach combines autobiographical and affective writing with an exploration of relational identity, becoming, deterritorialization and reterritorialization.

De Jong develops this approach through accounts of living and working in Qatar, examining how everyday experiences intersect with globalization, institutional power, capitalism and social relationships. Organized into seven interconnected plateaus, the dissertation uses narrative experimentation and rhizomatic mapping to investigate how identities are continuously constituted and transformed through relationships. Writing functions as both a method of inquiry and a means of articulating experiences that conventional ethnographic representation may overlook.

The research emphasizes that processes of deterritorialization and becoming do not necessarily lead to liberation or increased agency, but may also produce alienation, constraint and diminished capacities for action.

== Goals ==
Adams, Ellis, and Jones recognize two primary purposes for practicing autoethnographic research. Given the complicated history of ethnography, "autoethnographers speak against, or provide alternatives to, dominant, taken-for-granted, and harmful cultural scripts, stories, and stereotypes" and "offer accounts of personal experience to complement, or fill gaps in, existing research."As with other forms of qualitative research, autoethnographic "accounts may show how the desire for, and practice of, generalization in research can mask important nuances of cultural issues."

In addition to providing nuanced accounts of cultural phenomena, Adams, Ellis, and Jones argue that the goal of autoethnography "is to articulate insider knowledge of cultural experience." Underlying this argument is the assumption that "the writer can inform readers about aspects of cultural life that other researchers may not be able to know." Importantly, "[i]nsider knowledge does not suggest that an autoethnographer can articulate more truthful or more accurate knowledge as compared to outsiders, but rather that as authors we can tell our stories in novel ways when compared to how others may be able to tell them."

== Uses ==
Autoethnography is utilized across a variety of disciplines and can be presented in many forms, including but not limited to "short stories, poetry, fiction, novels, photographic essays, personal essays, journals, fragmented and layered writing, and social science prose."

Symbolic interactionists are particularly interested autoethnography, and examples can be found in a number of scholarly journals, such as Qualitative Inquiry, the Journal of the Society for the Study of Symbolic Interactionism, the Journal of Contemporary Ethnography, and the Journal of Humanistic Ethnography.

In performance studies, autoethnography acknowledges the researcher and the audience having equal weight. Portraying the performed "self" through writing then becomes an aim to create an embodied experience for the writer and the reader. This area acknowledges the inward and outward experience of ethnography in experiencing the subjectivity of the author. Audience members may experience the work of ethnography through reading/hearing/feeling (inward) and then have a reaction to it (outward), maybe by emotion. Ethnography and performance work together to invoke emotion in the reader.

Autoethnography is also used in film as a variant of the standard documentary film. It differs from the traditional documentary film in that its subject is the filmmaker. An autoethnographical film typically relates the life experiences and thoughts, views, and beliefs of the filmmaker, and as such, it is often considered to be rife with bias and image manipulation. Unlike other documentaries, autoethnographies do not usually make a claim of objectivity.

== Storyteller/narrator ==
In different academic disciplines (particularly communication studies and performance studies), the term autoethnography itself is contested and is sometimes used interchangeably with or referred to as personal narrative or autobiography. Autoethnographic methods include journaling, looking at archival records (whether institutional or personal), interviewing one's own self, and using writing to generate a self-cultural understandings. Reporting an autoethnography might take the form of a traditional journal article or scholarly book, performed on the stage, or be seen in the popular press. Autoethnography can include direct (and participant) observation of daily behavior; unearthing of local beliefs and perception and recording of life history (e.g. kinship, education, etc.); and in-depth interviewing: "The analysis of data involves interpretation on the part of the researcher" (Hammersley in Genzuk). However, rather than a portrait of the Other (person, group, culture), the difference is that the researcher is constructing a portrait of the self.

Autoethnography can also be "associated with narrative inquiry and autobiography" in that it foregrounds experience and story as a meaning-making enterprise. Maréchal argues that "narrative inquiry can provoke identification, feelings, emotions, and dialogue." Furthermore, the increased focus on incorporating autoethnography and Narrative Inquiry into qualitative research indicates a growing concern for how the style of academic writing informs the types of claims made. As Laurel Richardson articulates "I consider writing as a method of inquiry, a way of finding out about a topic...form and content are inseparable." For many researchers, experimenting with alternative forms of writing and reporting, including autoethnography, personal narrative, performative writing, layered accounts and writing stories, provides a way to create multiple layered accounts of a research study, creating not only the opportunity to create new and provocative claims but also the ability to do so in a compelling manner. Ellis (2004) says that autoethnographers advocate "the conventions of literary writing and expression" in that "autoethnographic forms feature concrete action, emotion, embodiment, self-consciousness, and introspection portrayed in dialogue, scenes, characterization, and plot" (p. xix).

According to Bochner and Ellis (2006), an autoethnographer is "first and foremost a communicator and a storyteller." In other words, autoethnography "depicts people struggling to overcome adversity" and shows "people in the process of figuring out what to do, how to live, and the meaning of their struggles" (p. 111). Therefore, according to them, autoethnography is "ethical practice" and "gifts" that has a caregiving function (p. 111). In essence autoethnography is a story that re-enacts an experience by which people find meaning and through that meaning are able to be okay with that experience.

In Dr. Mayukh Dewan's opinion, this can be a problem because many readers may see us as being too self-indulgent but they have to realise that our stories and experiences we share are not solely ours, but rather that they also represent the group we are autoethnographically representing.

In this storytelling process, the researcher seeks to make meaning of a disorienting experience. A life example in which autoethnography could be applied is the death of a family member or someone close by. In this painful experience people often wonder how they will go about living without this person and what it will be like. In this scenario, especially in religious homes, one often asks "Why God?" thinking that with an answer as to why the person died they can go about living. Others, wanting to be able to offer up an explanation to make the person feel better, generally say things such as "At least they are in a better place" or "God wanted him/her home." People, who are never really left with an explanation as to why, generally fall back on the reason that "it was their time to go" and through this somewhat "explanation" find themselves able to move on and keep living life. Over time when looking back at the experience of someone close to you dying, one may find that through this hardship they became a stronger more independent person, or that they grew closer to other family members. With these realizations, the person has actually made sense of and has become fine with the tragic experience that occurred. And through this autoethnography is performed.

== Evaluation ==
The main critique of autoethnography—and qualitative research in general—comes from the traditional social science methods that emphasize the objectivity of social research. In this critique, qualitative researchers are often called "journalists, or soft scientists," and their work, including autoethnography, is "termed unscientific, or only exploratory, or entirely personal and full of bias." Many quantitative researchers regard the materials produced by narrative as "the means by which a narrating subject, autonomous and independent...can achieve authenticity...This represents an almost total failure to use narrative to achieve serious social analysis."

According to Maréchal, the early criticism of autobiographical methods in anthropology was about "their validity on grounds of being unrepresentative and lacking objectivity." She also points out that evocative and emotional genres of autoethnography have been criticized by mostly analytic proponents for their "lack of ethnographic relevance as a result of being too personal." As she writes, they are criticized "for being biased, navel-gazing, self-absorbed, or emotionally incontinent, and for hijacking traditional ethnographic purposes and scholarly contribution."

The reluctance to accept narrative work as serious extends far beyond the realm of academia. In 1994, Arlene Croce refused to evaluate or even attend Bill T. Jones Still/Here performance. She echoed a quantitative stance towards narrative research by explaining,

I can't review someone I feel sorry or hopeless about...I'm forced to feel sorry because of the way they present themselves as: dissed blacks, abused women, or disenfranchised homosexuals—as performers, in short, who make victimhood victim art.

Croce illustrates what Adams, Jones, and Ellis refer to as "illusory boundaries and borders between scholarship and criticism." These "borders" are seen to hide or take away from the idea that autoethnographic evaluation and criticism present another personal story about the experience of an experience. Or as Craig Gingrich-Philbrook wrote, "any evaluation of autoethnography...is simply another story from a highly situated, privileged, empowered subject about something he or she experienced."

=== Rethinking traditional criteria ===
In her book's tenth chapter, titled "Evaluating and Publishing Autoethnography" (pp. 252–255), Ellis (2004) discusses how to evaluate an autoethnographic project, based on other authors' ideas about evaluating alternative modes of qualitative research. (See the special section in Qualitative Inquiry on "Assessing Alternative Modes of Qualitative and Ethnographic Research: How Do We Judge? Who Judges?") She presents several criteria for "good autoethnography", and indicates how these ideas resonate with each other.

First, Ellis mentions Richardson who described five factors she uses when reviewing personal narrative papers that includes analysis of both evaluative and constructive validity techniques. The criteria are:

(a) Substantive contribution: Does the piece contribute to our understanding of social life?
(b) Aesthetic merit: Does this piece succeed aesthetically? Is the text artistically shaped, satisfyingly complex, and not boring?
(c) Reflexivity: How did the author come to write this text? How has the author's subjectivity been both a producer and a product of this text?
(d) Impactfulness: Does this affect me emotionally and/or intellectually? Does it generate new questions or move me to action?
(e) Expresses a reality: Does this text embody a fleshed out sense of lived experience?

Autoethnographic manuscripts might include dramatic recall, unusual phrasing, and strong metaphors to invite the reader to "relive" events with the author. These guidelines may provide a framework for directing investigators and reviewers alike.

Further, Ellis suggests how Richardson's criteria mesh with criteria mentioned by Bochner who describes what makes him understand and feel with a story (Bochner, 2000, pp. 264–266). He looks for concrete details (similar to Richardson's expression of lived experience), structurally complex narratives (Richardson's aesthetic merit), author's attempt to dig under the superficial to get to vulnerability and honesty (Richardson's reflexivity), a standard of ethical self-consciousness (Richardson's substantive contribution), and a moving story (Richardson's impact) (Ellis, 2004, pp. 253–254).

In 2015, Adams, Jones, and Ellis collaborated to bring about a similar list of Goals for Assessing Autoethnography. The list encompasses descriptive, prescriptive, practical, and theoretical goals for evaluating autoethnographic work (2015, pp. 102–104):

1. Make contributions to knowledge;
2. Value the personal and experiential;
3. Demonstrate the power, craft, and responsibilities of stories and storytelling; and
4. Take a relationally responsible approach to research practice and representation.

==== Contributions to knowledge ====
Adams, Jones, and Ellis define the first goal of autoethnography as a conscious effort to "extend existing knowledge and research while recognizing that knowledge is both situated and contested." As Adams explains in his critique of his work Narrating the Closet,

I knew I had to contribute to knowledge about coming out by saying something new about the experience...I also needed a new angle toward coming out; my experience, alone, of coming out was not sufficient to justify a narrative.

With the critic's general decree of narrative as narcissism, Adams, Jones, and Ellis use the first goal of assessing autoethnography to explain the importance of striving to combine personal experience and existing theory while remaining mindful of the "insider insight that autoethnography offers researchers, participants, and readers/audiences." Ellis' Maternal Connections can be considered a successful incorporation of the first goal in that she "questions the idea of care-giving as a burden, instead of portraying caregiving as a loving and meaning-making relationship."

==== Value the personal and experiential ====
Adams, Jones, and Ellis define the second goal for assessing autoethnography with four elements which include

featuring the perspective of the self in context and culture, exploring experience as a means of insight about social life, embracing the risks of presenting vulnerable selves in research, and using emotions and bodily experience as means and modes of understanding.

This goal fully recognizes and commends the "I" in academic writing and calls for analysis of the subjective experience. In Jones' Lost and Found essay she writes,

I convey the sadness and the joy I feel about my relationships with my adopted child, the child I chose not to adopt, and my grandmother. I focus on the emotions and bodily experiences of both losing and memorializing my grandmother'

The careful and deliberate incorporation of auto (the "I," the self) into research is considered one of the most crucial aspects of the autoethnography process. The exploration of the ethics and care of presenting vulnerable selves is addressed at length by Adams in A Review of Narrative Ethics.

==== Stories and storytelling ====
Autoethnography showcases stories as the means in which sensemaking and researcher reflexivity create descriptions and critiques of culture. Adams, Jones, and Ellis write:

Reflexivity includes both acknowledging and critiquing our place and privilege in society and using the stories we tell to break long-held silences on power, relationships, cultural taboos, and forgotten and/or suppressed experiences.

A focus is placed a writer's ability to develop writing and representation skills alongside other analytic abilities. Adams switches between first-person and second-person narration in Living (In) the Closet: The Time of Being Closeted as a way to "bring readers into my story, inviting them to live my experiences alongside me, feeling how I felt and suggesting how they might, under similar circumstances, act as I did." Similarly, Ellis in Maternal Connections chose to steer away from the inclusion of references to the research literature or theory instead opting to "call on sensory details, movements, emotions, dialogue, and scene setting to convey an experience of taking care of a parent." The examples included above are incomplete. Autoethnographers exploring different narrative structures can be seen in Andrew Herrmann's use of layered accounts, Ellis' use of haibun, and the use of autoethnographic film by Rebecca Long and Anne Harris.

Addressing veracity and the art of story telling in his 2019 autoethnographic monograph Going All City: Struggle and Survival in LA's Graffiti Subculture, Stefano Bloch writes, "I do rely on artful rendering, but not artistic license."

==== Relationally responsible approach ====
Among the concepts in qualitative research is "relational responsibility". Researchers should work to make research relationships as collaborative, committed, and reciprocal as possible while taking care to safeguard identities and privacy of participants. Included under this concept is the accessibility of the work to a variety of readers which allows for the "opportunity to engage and improve the lives of our selves, participants, and readers/audiences." Autoethnographers struggle with relational responsibility as in Adams' critique of his work on coming out and recognizing:

...how others can perceive my ideas as relationally irresponsible concessions to homophobic others and to insidious heteronormative cultural structures; by not being aggressively critical, my work does not do enough to engage and improve the lives of others.

In the critique he also questions how relationally irresponsible he was by including several brief conversations in his work without consent and exploited other's experiences for his own benefit. Similar sentiments are echoed throughout Adams, Jones, and Ellis critiques of their own writing.

==== From "validity" to "truth" ====
As an idea that emerged from the tradition of social constructionism and interpretive paradigm, autoethnography challenges the traditional social scientific methodology that emphasizes the criteria for quality in social research developed in terms of validity. Carolyn Ellis writes,

In autoethnographic work, I look at validity in terms of what happens to readers as well as to research participants and researchers. To me, validity means that our work seeks verisimilitude; it evokes in readers a feeling that the experience described is lifelike, believable, and possible. You also can judge validity by whether it helps readers communicate with others different from themselves or offers a way to improve the lives of participants and readers—or even your own.

In this sense, Ellis emphasizes the "narrative truth" for autoethnographic writings.

I believe you should try to construct the story as close to the experience as you can remember it, especially in the initial version. If you do, it will help you work through the meaning and purpose of the story. But it's not so important that narratives represent lives accurately—only, as Art [Arthur Bochner] argues, "that narrators believe they are doing so" (Bochner, 2002, p. 86). Art believes that we can judge one narrative interpretation of events against another, but we cannot measure a narrative against the events themselves because the meaning of the events comes clear only in their narrative expression.

Instead, Ellis suggests to judge autoethnographic writings on the usefulness of the story, rather than only on accuracy. She quotes Art Bochner, who argues

that the real questions is what narratives do, what consequences they have, to what uses they can be put. Narrative is the way we remember the past, turn life into language, and disclose to ourselves and others the truth of our experiences. In moving from concern with the inner veridicality to outer pragmatics of evaluating stories, Plummer [2001, p. 401] also looks at uses, functions, and roles of stories, and adds that they "need to have rhetorical power enhanced by aesthetic delight (Ellis, 2004, p. 126-127).

Similarly,

Laurel Richardson [1997, p. 92] uses the metaphor of a crystal to deconstruct traditional validity. A crystal has an infinite number of shapes, dimensions and angles. It acts as a prism and changes shape, but still has structure. Another writer, Patti Lather [1993, p. 674], proposes counter-practices of authority that rupture validity as a "regime of truth" and lead to a critical political agenda [Cf. Olesen, 2000, p. 231]. She mentions the four subtypes [pp. 685-686]: "ironic validity, concerning the problems of representation; paralogical validity, which honors differences and uncertainties; rhizomatic validity, which seeks out multiplicity; and voluptuous validity, which seeks out ethics through practices of engagement and self-reflexivity (Ellis, 2004, pp. 124~125).

==== From "generalizability" to "resonance" ====
With regard to the term of "generalizability", Ellis points out that autoethnographic research seeks generalizability not just from the respondents but also from the readers. Ellis says:

I would argue that a story's generalizability is always being tested—not in the traditional way through random samples of respondents, but by readers as they determine if a story speaks to them about their experience or about the lives of others they know. Readers provide theoretical validation by comparing their lives to ours, by thinking about how our lives are similar and different and the reasons why. Some stories inform readers about unfamiliar people or lives. We can ask, after Stake [1994], "does the story have 'naturalistic generalization'?" meaning that it brings "felt" news from one world to another and provides opportunities for the reader to have vicarious experience of the things told. The focus of generalizability moves from respondents to readers.(p. 195)

This generalizability through the resonance of readers' lives and "lived experience" (Richardson, 1997) in autoethnographic work, intends to open up rather than close down conversation (Ellis, 2004, p. 22).

=== Benefits and concerns ===
Denzin's criterion is whether the work has the possibility to change the world and make it a better place (Denzin, 2000, p. 256). This position fits with Clough, who argues that good autoethnographic writing should motivate cultural criticism. Autoethnographic writing should be closely aligned with theoretical reflection, says Clough, so that it can serve as a vehicle for thinking "new sociological subjects" and forming "new parameters of the social" (Clough, 2000, p. 290). Though Richardson and Bochner are less overtly political than Denzin and Clough, they indicate that good personal narratives should contribute to positive social change and move us to action (Bochner, 2000, p. 271).

In addition to helping the researcher make sense of his or her individual experience, autoethnographies are political in nature as they engage their readers in political issues and often ask us to consider things, or do things differently. Chang argues that autoethnography offers a research method friendly to researchers and readers because autoethnographic texts are engaging and enable researchers to gain a cultural understanding of self in relation to others, on which cross-cultural coalition can be built between self and others.

Also, autoethnography as a genre frees us to move beyond traditional methods of writing, promoting narrative and poetic forms, displays of artifacts, photographs, drawings, and live performances (Cons, p. 449). Denzin says autoethnography must be literary, present cultural and political issues, and articulate a politics of hope. The literary criteria he mentions are covered in what Richardson advocates: aesthetic value. Ellis elaborates her idea in autoethnography as good writing that through the plot, dramatic tension, coherence, and verisimilitude, the author shows rather than tells, develops characters and scenes fully, and paints vivid sensory experiences.

While advocating autoethnography for its value, some researchers argue that there are also several concerns about autoethnography. Chang warns autoethnographers of pitfalls that they should avoid in doing autoethnography:

(1) excessive focus on self in isolation from others; (2) overemphasis on narration rather than analysis and cultural interpretation; (3) exclusive reliance on personal memory and recalling as a data source; (4) negligence of ethical standards regarding others in self-narratives; and (5) inappropriate application of the label autoethnography.

Some qualitative researchers have expressed their concerns about the worth and validity of autoethnography. In Expressions of Ethnography, Robert Krizek expresses concern about the possibility for autoethnography to devolve into narcissism. Krizek goes on to suggest that autoethnography, no matter how personal, should always connect to some larger element of life.

One of the main advantages of personal narratives is that they give us access into learners' private worlds and provide rich data. Another advantage is the ease of access to data since the researcher calls on his or her own experiences as the source from which to investigate a particular phenomenon. It is this advantage that also entails a limitation as, by subscribing analysis to a personal narrative, the research is also limited in its conclusions. However, Bochner and Ellis consider that this limitation on the self is not valid, since "If culture circulates through all of us, how can autoethnography be free of connection to a world beyond the self?"

== Criticisms and concerns ==
Similar to other forms of qualitative and art-based research, autoethnography has faced many criticisms. As Sparkes stated, "The emergence of autoethnography and narratives of self...has not been trouble-free, and their status as proper research remains problematic."

The most recurrent criticism of autoethnography is of its strong emphasis on self, which is at the core of the resistance to accepting autoethnography as a valuable research method. Thus, autoethnographies have been criticised for being self-indulgent, narcissistic, introspective and individualised.

Another criticism is of the reality personal narratives or autoethnographies represent. As Geoffrey Walford states, "If people wish to write fiction, they have every right to do so, but not every right to call it research." This criticism originates from a statement by Ellis and Bochner, conceiving autoethnography as a narrative that "is always a story about the past and not the past itself." To this, Walford asserts that "the aim of research is surely to reduce the distortion as much as possible." Walford's concerns are focused on how much of the accounts presented as autoethnographies represent real conversations or events as they happened and how much they are just inventions of the authors.

=== Evaluation ===
Several critiques exist regarding evaluating autoethnographical works grounded in interpretive paradigm.

From within qualitative research, some researchers have posited that autoethnographers, along with others, fail to meet positivist standards of validity and reliability. Schwandt, for instance, argues that some social researchers have "come to equate being rational in social science with being procedural and criteriological." Building on quantitative foundations, Lincoln and Guba translate quantitative indicators into qualitative quality indicators, namely: credibility (parallels internal validity), transferability (parallels external validity), dependability (parallels reliability), and confirmability (parallels objectivity and seeks to critically examine whether the researcher has acted in good faith during the course of the research). Smith and Smith and Heshusius critique these qualitative translations and warn that the claim of compatibility (between qualitative and quantitative criteria) cannot be sustained, and by making such claims, researchers are in effect closing down the conversation. Smith points out that "the assumptions of interpretive inquiry are incompatible with the desire for foundational criteria. How we are to work out this problem, one way or another, would seem to merit serious attention."

Secondly, some other researchers questions the need for specific criteria itself. Bochner and Clough both are concerned that too much emphasis on criteria will move researchers back to methodological policing, a diversion from imagination, ethical issues in autographic work, and creating better ways of living. The autoethnographer internally judges its quality. Evidence is tacit, individualistic, and subjective. Practice-based quality is based in the lived research experience itself rather than in its formal evidencing per se. Bochner says:

Self-narratives... are not so much academic as they are existential, reflecting a desire to grasp or seize the possibilities of meaning, which is what gives life its imaginative and poetic qualities... a poetic social science does not beg the question of how to separate good narrativization from bad... [but] the good ones help the reader or listener to understand and feel the phenomena under scrutiny.

Finally, in addition to this anti-criteria stance of some researchers, some scholars have suggested that the criteria used to judge autoethnography should not necessarily be the same as traditional criteria used to judge other qualitative research investigations. They argue that autoethnography has been received with a significant degree of academic suspicion because it contravenes certain qualitative research traditions. The controversy surrounding autoethnography is in part related to the problematic exclusive use of the self to produce research. This use of self as the only data source in autoethnography has been questioned. Accordingly, autoethnographies have been criticized for being too self-indulgent and narcissistic.

Holt associates this problem with this problem as two crucial issues in "the fourth moment of qualitative research" Denzin and Lincoln presented; the dual crises of representation and legitimation. The crisis of representation refers to the writing practices (i.e., how researchers write and represent the social world). Additionally, verification issues relating to methods and representation are (re)considered as problematic. The crisis of legitimation questions traditional criteria used for evaluating and interpreting qualitative research, involving a rethinking of terms such as validity, reliability, and objectivity. Holt says:

Much like the autoethnographic texts themselves, the boundaries of research and their maintenance are socially constructed (Sparkes, 2000). In justifying autoethnography as proper research... ethnographers have acted autobiographically before, but in the past they may not have been aware of doing so, and taken their genre for granted (Coffey, 1999). Autoethnographies may leave reviewers in a perilous position.... the reviewers were not sure if the account was proper research (because of the style of representation), and the verification criteria they wished to judge this research by appeared to be inappropriate. Whereas the use of autoethnographic methods may be increasing, knowledge of how to evaluate and provide feedback to improve such accounts appears to be lagging. As reviewers begin to develop ways in which to judge autoethnography, they must resist the temptation to "seek universal foundational criteria lest one form of dogma simply replaces another" (Sparkes, 2002b, p. 223). However, criteria for evaluating personal writing have barely begun to develop.

== Notable autoethnographers ==
- Leon Anderson, sociologist and academic
- Arthur P. Bochner, academic
- Jesse Cornplanter, actor, artist, author and Seneca Faithkeeper
- Frank Day, artist
- Norman K. Denzin, sociologist and academic
- Carolyn Ellis, academic
- Peter Pitseolak, artist and historian
- Ernest Spybuck, artist

== Sources ==
- Ellis, C. (2001). With Mother/With Child: A True Story. Qualitative Inquiry, 7 (5), 598–616.
- Ellis, C. (2009). Revision: Autoethnographic Reflections on Life and Work. Walnut Creek, CA: Left Coast Press.
- Herrmann, A. F., & Di Fate, K. (Eds.) (2014). The new ethnography: Goodall, Trujillo, and the necessity of storytelling. Storytelling Self Society: An Interdisciplinary Journal of Storytelling Studies, 10.
- Hodges, N. (2015). The Chemical Life. Health Communication, 30, 627–634.
- Hodges, N. (2015). The American Dental Dream. Health Communication, 30, 943–950.
- Holman Jones, S. (2005). Autoethnography: Making the personal political. In N. K. Denzin & Y. S. Lincoln. (Eds.) Handbook of Qualitative Research, (2nd ed., pp. 763–791). Thousand Oaks, CA: Sage Publications.
- Holman Jones, S., Adams, T. & Ellis, C. (2013). Handbook of Autoethnography. Walnut Creek CA: Left Coast Press
- Krizek, R. (2003). Ethnography as the Excavation of Personal Narrative. In R.P.Clair(Ed.), Expressions of ethnography: novel approaches to qualitative methods (pp. 141–152). New York: SUNY Press.
- Plummer, K. (2001). The call of life stories in ethnographic research. In P. Atkinson, A. Coffey, S. Delamont, J. Lofland, and L. Lofland (Eds.), Handbook of Ethnography (pp. 395–406). London: Sage.
- Richardson, L. (1997). Fields of play: Constructing an academic life. New Brunswick, N. J.: Rutgers University Press.
- Richardson, L. (2007). Writing: A method of inquiry. In N. K. Denzin & Y. S. Lincoln. (Eds.) Handbook of Qualitative Research, (2nd ed., pp. 923–948). Thousand Oaks, CA: Sage Publications.
- Stake, R. E. (1994). Case studies. In N. K. Denzin & Y. S. Lincoln. (Eds.) Handbook of Qualitative Research, (2nd ed., pp. 236–247). Thousand Oaks, CA: Sage Publications.
