= Leon Anderson (sociologist) =

American sociologist

- Born: 1950 (age 75–76); Snohomish, Washington
- Occupations: Sociologist, academic, researcher
- Known for: Analytic autoethnography
- Awards: Charles Horton Cooley Award, Society for the Study of Symbolic Interaction; Scholarly Achievement Award, North Central Sociological Association; Distinguished Scholarship Award, Pacific Sociological Association

Academic background
- Education: B.A; M.A; Ph.D.
- Alma mater: Portland State University; University of Texas at Austin

Leon Anderson is an American sociologist, academic and researcher. He is a professor emeritus of Sociology at Ohio University and Utah State University.

Anderson's primary scholarly contributions fall in social inequality and qualitative social science research methods. Among these, he has focused on sociology of deviance, qualitative research methods, homelessness, and auto-ethnographic methods. Anderson has authored or coauthored several books including, Down on Their Luck: A Study of Homeless Street People, Analyzing Social Settings: A Guide to Qualitative Observation and Analysis 4th Edition and Deviance: Social Constructions and Blurred Boundaries. Down on Their Luck has been translated into Portuguese and Analyzing Social Settings has been translated into Polish.

In 2012 he co-edited an issue of the journal American Behavioral Scientist on mental health courts.

== Early life and education ==
Anderson was born in Snohomish, Washington, in 1950. He graduated from Portland State University in 1980. He then studied at University of Texas at Austin and received his master's degree and Doctoral degrees in 1985 and 1987, respectively.

== Career ==
Following his Ph.D. degree, Anderson joined Ohio University as an assistant professor in 1988. He was promoted to associate professor in 1993, and to Professor in 2000. In 2011 he joined Utah State University as a professor of sociology. He retired as professor emeritus in 2019.

== Research ==
Anderson's research is primarily focused on social inequality, sociology of deviance, qualitative research methods, homelessness, and autoethnographic methods. He is recognized for articulating analytic autoethnography, a genre of autoethnography focused on extending theoretical understandings of broader social phenomena.

=== Qualitative research methods ===
Anderson has collaborated with numerous researchers to promote and expand qualitative research methods. He and his coauthors have examined the information yield of fieldwork roles, facilitative dynamics in research with deviant street populations, distorting tendencies in research with the homeless, strategies for linking of ethnographic research to sociological theory, and challenges in social service ethnographic research.

Anderson's contributions to qualitative research methods also include his co-authorship of the fourth edition of classic ethnographic methods textbook, entitled, Analyzing Social Settings: A Guide to Qualitative Observation and Analysis, which was published in 2005. The book was reviewed as an "excellent" book that "introduced the reader to the three broad tasks of gathering, focusing and analyzing data with clarity and appropriate complexity." The reviewer also stated that "the direct and clear writing reminds one of a truly useful handbook in a favorite subject field".

=== Autoethnography ===
In 2006, Anderson introduced the term 'analytic autoethnography' as an alternative to the more widely known genre of 'evocative autoethnography'. Anderson presented five features of analytic autoethnography, including complete member researcher status, analytic reflexivity, narrative visibility of the researcher's self, dialogue with informants beyond the self, and a commitment to theoretical analysis. While he has since acknowledged analytic features in some evocative autoethnography, Anderson continues to advocate for optimizing theoretical contributions of analytic autoethnography. Anderson has also explored the wide variety of leisure settings and activities that have been approached through auto-ethnographical research.

== Awards and honors ==
- 1980 - First and Third Place Feature Story Awards, Alaska State Press Club
- 1990-1991 - Research Fellowship, Ohio Dept. of Mental Health
- 1993 - Charles Horton Cooley Award, Society for the Study of Symbolic Interaction
- 1994 - Scholarly Achievement Award, North Central Sociological Association
- 1994 - Distinguished Scholarship Award, Pacific Sociological Association
- 2016 - USU Diversity Award, Utah State University

== Bibliography ==
=== Books ===
- Down on Their Luck: A Study of Homeless Street People (1993) ISBN 9780520079892
- Desafortunados: Um Estudo Sobre o Povo da Rua (1998) ISBN 9788532620767
- Analyzing Social Settings: A Guide to Qualitative Observation and Analysis 4th Edition (2005) ISBN 9780534528614
- ANALIZA UKŁADÓW SPOŁECZNYCHP: rzewodnik metodologiczny po badaniach jakościowych (2009) ISBN 9788373833999
- Deviance: Social Constructions and Blurred Boundaries (2017) ISBN 9780520965935

=== Selected articles ===
- Anderson, L. (2006). Analytic autoethnography. Journal of contemporary ethnography, 35(4), 373–395.
- Snow, D. A., & Anderson, L. (1987). Identity work among the homeless: The verbal construction and avowal of personal identities. American journal of sociology, 92(6), 1336–1371.
- David Snow, Calvin Morrill, and Leon Anderson. 2003. “Elaborating Analytic Ethnography: Linking Fieldwork and Theory.” Ethnography 2: 181–200.
- David Snow, Leon Anderson, Susan Gonzalez-Baker, and Michael Martin. 1986. "The Myth of Pervasive Mental Illness among the Homeless." Social Problems 33: 407–423. Reprinted in Sociology: Windows on Society, John W. Heeren and Marylee Mason (eds.), Los Angeles: Roxbury Press (1990).
- David Snow, Leon Anderson, and Susan Gonzalez-Baker. 1989. "Criminality and Homeless Men: An Empirical Assessment." Social Problems 36: 532–549.
