= Visual autoethnography =

Autoethnographic qualitative research method

Visual autoethnography is an autoethnographic qualitative research method in which an author uses self-reflection and visuals, including photography, painting, drawing, video extracts, film, and/or other forms of visual expression to engage with personal experiences and connect them to wider cultural, political, and social phenomena. Visual autoethnography has been cited as useful to convey feeling or affect to the viewer while challenging conventional research methods. Visual autoethnographers use visuals to represent and reflect on potential shared experience with viewers, "facilitating commonality while simultaneously providing individual moments of subjective reflection." The use of imagery varies in visual autoethnographic examples. Related approaches include musical autoethnography.

== Use of imagery ==
Visuals in autoethnographic research have been noted to exist in a space which transcends linguistic alienation by capturing what words cannot describe and by revealing emotions and opening intimacies of visual exchange. Laurie Eldridge states: "I try to disassociate myself from the context of the images and let them work together in ways that I can't anticipate." Caroline Scarles states that these exchanges may include silence, yet "while such silences may create disjuncture and fractures in conversation, the mutuality of visual autoethnography mobilizes spaces of comfort and understanding as an unspoken 'knowing' emerges between respondent and researcher as those-who-have-experienced."

Sometimes imagery is tightly interwoven with written argument while in other examples the imagery is only loosely tied with the surrounding text. In Terry Ownby's visual autoethnography on childhood and self-identity, he states that "each photograph had its own narrative panel that textually and visually provided discourse for the art patron's understanding of the photograph's subject matter content." In other cases, as noted by Elisabeth Chaplin, "the work of fine-tuning the interpretation is left to the respondent who, in turn, wants to resolve the uncertainty." Chaplin states that the visual autoethnographer aims to "have the reader/viewer working emotionally alongside the author" while delicately maintaining a balance between written text and visuals.

Laurie Eldridge notes in her autoethnographic work how Western education programs that are test-based and obsessed with measuring student's 'success' numerically only value "'the nuts and bolts of art': perspective, shading, color theory, and elements and principles of design, and other basic knowledge used in understanding and creating Western art." This excludes art education that is inclusive of non-Western artmaking methods, which is frustrating to Eldridge. This perspective on art education is incorporated into the symbolism reflected in her collage-based autoethnography: "in creating this visual autoethnography, I hope that other art educators are inspired to find their voices and to see if their experiences resonate with my own."

Elisabeth Chaplin argues that because visual autoethnography is operating within the field of social science rather than art, "that aesthetic force cannot be allowed to overwhelm the social argument," yet recognizes that what is understood as acceptable research is ultimately determined by the gatekeepers of academia. Chaplin concludes through her work with visual autoethnography that the methodological approach ultimately displays "more authorial honesty than conventional social scientific texts" reveals by amplifying "underlying structural elements such as academic craftwork, methodological 'distortions,' editing demands, personal secrets; all of which lurk in the shadows."

== Power relations ==
Visual autoethnography has been noted by various scholars as a methodology which challenges power relations for the maker and the viewer. Drawing on the work of Mary Louise Pratt and bell hooks in his research on gang photography, Richard T. Rodríguez refers to the autoethnography as "a practice in which colonized subjects turn the gaze inward." Pratt referred to the autoethnography or autoethnographic expression as "instances in which colonized subjects undertake to represent themselves in ways that engage with the colonizer's own terms... in response to or in dialogue with those metropolitan representations." hooks referred to this in relation to the visual, stating "unlike photographs constructed so that black images would appear as the embodiment of colonizing fantasies, snapshots gave us a way to see ourselves, a sense of how we looked when we were 'not wearing a mask,' when we were not attempting to perfect the image for the white-supremacist gaze."

However, this still comes with certain complications, as noted by Richard Fung in his work with visual autoethnographic film: "the subject-object in autoethnographic film and video is the same classically ethnographic object: the Other of colonial discourse and the Other of dominant social discourse," recognizing that "videotaping a subject as close as my mother did not release me from the ethical risks of manipulation and sensationalizing; minoritized people are not immune from reinscribing stereotypical or exoticizing discourses about themselves and others." Fung concludes that "autoethnographic film- and video-making can be seen as a self-reflexive practice in which modes of visual self-fashioning produce cultural critique."
