= Bochner =

Bochner is a surname. Notable people with the surname include:

- Arthur P. Bochner, American communication scholar
- Hart Bochner (born 1956), Canadian film actor, screenwriter, director, and producer
- Lloyd Bochner (1924–2005), Canadian actor
- Mel Bochner (1940–2025), American conceptual artist
- Salomon Bochner (1899–1982), American mathematician

== See also ==
- Büchner
