= Yvonna Sessions Lincoln =

American education researcher

Yvonna S. Lincoln
- Born: Yvonna Sessions; May 25, 1944 (age 82); Tampa, Florida
- Spouse: Egon Guba

Yvonna Sessions Lincoln (born May 25, 1944) is an American methodologist and higher-education scholar. Currently a Distinguished Professor of Higher Education and Human Resource Development at Texas A&M University in College Station, Texas, Lincoln holds the Ruth Harrington Endowed Chair of Educational Leadership. As an author, she has been largely collected by libraries.

Lincoln is best known in social-science research for her contribution to qualitative methodology. With her late husband, Egon Guba (March 1, 1924 – March 26, 2008), Lincoln wrote Naturalistic Inquiry in 1985. The book offers a critique of positivism and suggests the ontology, epistemology, axiology, methodology, and methods that comprise a "naturalistic" paradigm for inquiry. Since its publication in 1985, Naturalistic Inquiry has been translated into 8 languages including Spanish, Portuguese, Chinese, Korean, and Japanese.

== Early life ==
Lincoln was born Yvonna Sessions in Tampa, Florida. One of five children born to Edgar Eugene Sessions Sr. (a welder for Atlantic Coastline Railroad) and Mary Bond Brown Sessions (an insurance rater for Metropolitan Life Insurance), Lincoln was the eldest daughter.

Lincoln graduated from Hillsborough High School in Hillsborough County, Florida in 1962 and attended Michigan State University in East Lansing, Michigan for undergraduate studies. At Michigan State she majored in history and sociology earning her A.B. in 1967. Lincoln earned an M.A. in Medieval and East European History from University of Illinois Urbana-Champaign in 1970 and a doctorate in higher education, organizational theory, and program evaluation at Indiana University (1987).

While studying at Indiana University, Lincoln met and later married Egon Guba. It was this professional and personal relationship that gave birth to Naturalistic Inquiry, which "began the earthquake-like revolution in educational research which resulted in the growth of qualitative research methods in education."

== Naturalistic Inquiry ==
In their preface, Lincoln and Guba explain that "We [researchers, scientists, and laypersons] are all so imbued with the tenets of science that we take its assumptions utterly for granted, so much so that we almost cannot comprehend the possibility that there might be other ways of thinking. And when other ways are suggested, we are inclined to shut our ears, feeling that merely to listen to them is, quite literally, a heresy." Provocatively, Lincoln and Guba then "[propose] such a heresy." The goal of Naturalistic Inquiry was not to introduce previously unconsidered ideas as much as it was to aggregate, streamline, and sell a "palatable" and "reasonable" alternative to traditional positivist research. In Naturalistic Inquiry, Lincoln and Guba "[contrast] postpositivist and naturalist paradigms on philosophical and methodological dimensions."

The major naturalist axioms include:

- Realities are multiple, socially-constructed, and holistic (ontology).
- Knower and known are interactive, inseparable (epistemology).
- Only time- and context-bound working hypotheses are possible (generalizability).
- All entities are in a state of mutual simultaneous shaping, so that it is impossible to distinguish causes from effects (causality).
- Inquiry is value-bound (axiology).

Additionally, Naturalistic Inquiry offers instructions to researchers wishing to engage in its paradigm. Chapters are devoted to "Designing a Naturalistic Inquiry," "Implementing the Naturalistic Inquiry," "Establishing Trustworthiness," "Processing Naturalistically Obtained Data," and "Case Reporting, Member Checking, and Auditing."

=== Criticism ===
Early criticism of Naturalistic Inquiry resulted from perceived inconsistencies in the subjective nature of the paradigm and the objective evaluation strategies of trustworthiness. Holt (1991) argues that while Lincoln and Guba "advocate that the field researcher follow certain techniques that increase the trustworthiness of the research (dimensionalized as credibility, transferability, dependability, and confirmability)...the trustworthiness criterion and associated techniques proposed by Lincoln and Guba and Wallendorf and Belk contradict the nature of the interpretive task, and furthermore, pose insurmountable problems in application."

Perhaps anticipating this response, Lincoln and Guba (1986) published "But is it rigorous?: Trustworthiness and authenticity in naturalistic evaluation." This article proposes that the trustworthiness criteria are principally methodological criteria, deriving largely from anthropology and sociology. On the other hand, the authenticity criteria are derived solely as outgrowths of the metaphysical assumptions of naturalistic/constructivist inquiry, and are considerably more interpretive and community-driven. Further, the tendency of the latter criteria is toward social justice and participant utility.

Later criticism of Naturalistic Inquiry has revolved around presumed orthodoxy in the paradigm that binds post-modern approaches to collection and analysis of qualitative data.

== Professional ==
Lincoln has served on the faculty of three institutions of higher education including Texas A&M University, Vanderbilt University, and University of Kansas. While at these universities, she has been a Department Head (Texas A&M University), Program Director (Texas A&M University and University of Kansas), University Distinguished Professor (Texas A&M University), Professor (Texas A&M University), Associate Professor (Vanderbilt University and University of Kansas), and Assistant Professor (University of Kansas).

She has served as the President of the Association for the Study of Higher Education (1997–1998), the Division J Vice-president of the American Educational Research Association (1990–1992), and the president of the American Evaluation Association (1989–1990).

Some of her many awards include:

- Presidential Citation, American Educational Research Association (2013)
- Lifetime Achievement Award, International Congress of Qualitative Inquiry (2010)
- Association of Former Students' University Distinguished Research Award (2009)
- Howard R. Bowen Career Achievement Award, Association for the Study of Higher Education (2004)
- Indiana University College of Education Distinguished Alumna Award (2002)
- Ruth Harrington Chair of Educational Leadership University Distinguished Professor of Higher Education (2001)
- Distinguished Achievement Award for Research, Association of Former Students, Texas A&M University, Spring (1997)
- Research Achievement Award, Association for the Study of Higher Education (1993)
- Sidney Suslow Distinguished Research Award, Association for Institutional Research (1991)

== Recent work ==
Along with Norman K. Denzin (University of Illinois Urbana-Champaign), Lincoln has published six editions of the Handbook of Qualitative Research. The Handbook, as it's known, is considered a touchstone for qualitative scholars, putting some of the greatest methodology minds in conversation with one another.

Lincoln's most recent work, The Constructivist Credo (2013), won the 2014 American Educational Research Association Qualitative Research Special Interest Group Book Award. The book (co-authored with her late husband Egon Guba) is a "set of foundational principles for those wishing to conduct social science research within the constructivist paradigm."

Her current scholarship explores the ways in which neoliberalism and academic capitalism affect faculty work–life.
