= Jane Hubert =

British social anthropologist (1935–2019)

Jane Hubert (16 March 1935 – 21 June 2019) was a social anthropologist, known in particular for her work in mental health and intellectual disability. She was also known for her work in the field of cultural memory studies and archaeology.

== Academic career ==
Hubert was Honorary Senior Researcher in Social Anthropology at St George's, University of London and Honorary Senior Research Associate in the UCL Institute of Archaeology, University College London. At St George's, she worked on several research projects, including the World Health Organisation project "Intellectual Disabilities" (St George's, and Gouverneur Kremers Centre).

== Hubert's support of Peter Ucko and contribution to archaeology ==
Hubert was the partner of Peter Ucko (former director of the Institute of Archaeology, UCL) for 27 years, and supported him stalwartly in his archaeological work: for example, the World Archaeological Congress, travelling with him and Wang Tao in China, editing several volumes in the One World Archaeology series, and, after his death, the "Transitional Objects" project for the Ucko Collection. She is buried with Peter Ucko on the eastern side of Highgate Cemetery

== Publications ==
Hubert has an extensive record of publications (see external links below), the following are merely a selection:

- 2016 The Experience of Institutionalisation: Social Exclusion, Stigma and Loss of Identity (Routledge, 2016) ISBN 9780415818308
- 2010 (ed.) Madness, Disability and Social Exclusion: The Archaeology and Anthropology of 'Difference' (One World Archaeology series)
- 2004 (ed. with Cressida Fforde and Paul Turnbull) The Dead and their Possessions: Repatriation in Principle, Policy and Practice (One World Archaeology series)
- 1997 (ed. with David Carmichael, Brian Reeves and Audhild Schanche) Sacred Sites, Sacred Places (One World Archaeology series)
