= Linguistic alienation =

Inability to give expression to experience through language

Linguistic alienation is an inability to give expression to experience through language or a feeling that language is incomplete or fails to capture experience. The term can be used to describe how language reduces experiences, emotions, feelings, and other indescribable phenomena into a limited and regulatory modality. Linguistic alienation has been described as a pervasive phenomenon, yet has not received sustained consideration.

== Effects ==
Linguistic alienation is said to confine human ability to express abstract concepts and feelings. May Hamdan states that "using words to represent abstract truth is similar to using a two-dimensional medium to represent a three-dimensional object." Linguistic alienation can produce existentialist alienating effects from everyday experience and from any connection to the world that a language or languages are used within to make sense of reality. This may produce varied effects. Philosopher Carolyn Culbertson argues that this alienation does not undermine what Maurice Blanchot refers to as the "demand to write," but rather deepens "our need for empathic understanding as it seeks to reach the ear of an other."

Linguistic alienation has been described in relation to colonialism as part of the process in which the language of the colonizer is imposed on colonized people in an effort to alienate them from their own culture and subjugate them in their own land. Ngũgĩ wa Thiong'o describes language as "the carrier of memory [and] without memory, we cannot negotiate our relationship with nature [or] our relationship with one another. We cannot even negotiate our relationship to our own bodies and our own minds." Thiong'o explains that colonial powers therefore targeted the language of the colonized in order to destroy that which "cements the whole economic, political, cultural, social, [and] psychological, aspects of that community" as well as the memory of that community.

Once alienated, the colonized are only able to develop a sense of self in the colonizer's world "if they first embraced the national literature and language of their imperial masters." Peruvian author José María Arguedas, bilingual in Spanish and Quechua, described how "formal education in the national language also implied the imposition of a different set of beliefs and way of being, since Spanish remained an alien language for the native student." Arguedas explains how the Indigenous person in this process often internalizes their own inferiority to express concepts and feelings through language, because their Indigenous language and culture is inferiorized and devalued in colonizer society, where colonizer language is now valued.

In relation to the English language, young people are understood as the "drivers of linguistic change," which has been identified as creating adverse effects for elderly people who experience increased linguistic alienation "even as they control the institutions – universities, publishers, newspapers, broadcasters – that define standard English."

== Solutions ==
Susan Petrilli and Augusto Ponzio describe that "the problem of linguistic alienation cannot be adequately solved simply by denouncing deviations from paradigms that are pre-established or that are proposed within the boundaries of this or that language viewed as a self-sufficient system; or simply by constructing one's own model of how language should be." In this sense, language would be placed in relation to itself (a problem of syntax). Petrilli and Ponzio propose that language should be understood in relation to existence itself through connecting the linguistic to the non-linguistic.

Because words each have attached meanings that come along with their usage, some scholars posit the usage of symbols to remedy the loadedness of language as well as using body language in combination with language.
