= Norm Friesen =

Canadian academic

- Born: March 21, 1966 (age 59)
- Education: Johns Hopkins University, University of Alberta, Simon Fraser University
- Occupation: Professor in Educational Technology

Norm Friesen (born March 21, 1966) is Professor in Educational Technology at Boise State University and Canada Research Chair in E-Learning Practices at Thompson Rivers University.

Norm Friesen studied German Literature, Secondary Education, and Communication at the Johns Hopkins University, University of Alberta and Simon Fraser University (respectively). He has undertaken teaching and research at the University of Toronto, the University of Innsbruck and Athabasca University.

He has led the CanCore Learning object metadata initiative from 2003 to 2010, and is co-editor of the peer reviewed open content journal Phenomenology and Practice. Friesen is also a member of the Canadian delegation to the ISO/IEC JTC 1 subcommittee 36, for Learning, Education and Training.

Friesen has been involved in Wikiversity research.

Friesen's research interests include media theory, alternative pedagogies, technical e-learning standardization, phenomenology and ethnomethodology.

== Works ==
- Friesen, N., Fisher, S., Roberts, A. (2004). CanCore Guidelines for the Implementation of Learning Object Metadata., Athabasca University.
- Friesen, N. (2004). Three Objections to Learning Objects. In McGreal, R. (ed.) Online Education Using Learning Objects. London: Routledge. pp. 59–70.
- Friesen, N. & Hopkins J., (2008) ' Wikiversity; or education meets the free culture movement: An ethnographic investigation', First Monday, Volume 13 Number 10–6 October 2008
- Friesen, N. (2009). Re-Thinking E-Learning Research: Foundations, Methods and Practices. New York: Peter Lang.
- Friesen, N. (2011). The Place of the Classroom and the Space of the Screen. New York: Peter Lang.
- Friesen, N. (2013). Forgotten Connections: On Culture and Upbringing. London: Routledge. Translation of: Klaus Mollenhauer. (1983). Vergessene Zusammenhänge: Über Kultur und Erziehung. Munich: Juventa Verlag.
- Friesen, N. (2017). The Lecture and the Textbook - Education in the Age of New Media. Johns Hopkins University Press.
- Friesen, N. (2017). The pedagogical relation past and present: experience, subjectivity and failure. The Journal of Curriculum Studies 49(6), 743-756.
