= One World Archaeology =

Book series on archaeology

One World Archaeology is a book series focusing on archaeology and education about the past.

== About the Series ==
One World Archaeology is one of five book series associated with the World Archaeological Congress (WAC). Editors and contributors to these series waive any royalties, allowing all royalties to be used to further the work of the WAC. "Publications in the One World Archaeology series contain selections of the papers presented at the WAC Congresses, held every four years. This series developed as an outcome of the inaugural World Archaeological Congress held in Southampton, England in 1986. The subject matter of this series is wide-ranging, reflecting the diverse interests of WAC. WAC gives place to considerations of power and politics in framing archaeological questions and results. WAC also gives place and privilege to minorities who have often been silenced or regarded as beyond capable of making main line contributions to the field."

The other four series are Worlds of Archaeology, Indigenous Archaeologies, Global Cultural Heritage Manual Series, and Research Handbooks in Archaeology.

== Editorship of One World Archaeology ==
- Vols 1-37 - series editor: Peter Ucko
- Vols 38-47 - executive series editor: Peter Stone
- Vols 38-47 - academic series editors: Martin Hall and Julian Thomas
- Vols 48 onwards - academic series editors: Joan Gero, Mark Leone and Robin Torrence

== Publications in the One World Archaeology Series ==
- 2018 - Cyber-Archaeology and Grand Narratives: Digital Technology and Deep-Time Perspectives on Culture Change in the Middle East (ed. by Thomas Levy and Ian Jones)
- 2017 - Collision or Collaboration: Archaeology Encounters Economic Development (ed. by Peter Gould and Anne K. Pyburn)
- 2014 - Art and Archaeology: Collaborations, Conversations, Criticisms (ed. by Ian Alden Russell and Andrew Cochrane)
- 2014 - Rock Art and Sacred Landscapes (ed. by D.L. Gillette, M. Greer, M. Helene Hayward and W. Breen Murray)
- 2013 - Contesting Ethnoarchaeologies: Traditions, Theories, Prospects (ed. by Arkadiusz Marciniak and Nurcan Yalman)
- 2013 - Tracking the Neolithic House in Europe: Sedentism, Architecture and Practice (ed. by Daniela Hofmann and Jessica Smyth)
- 2013 - Training and Practice for Modern Day Archaeologists (ed. by John H. Jameson and James Eogan)
- 2012 - Archaeology of Spiritualities (ed. by Kathryn Rountree, Christine Morris and Alan A.D. Peatfield)
- 2011 - Archaeologies of Internment (ed. by Adrian Myers and Gabriel Moshenska)
- 2011 - Unpacking the Collection: Networks of Material and Social Agency in the Museum (ed. by S. Byrne, A. Clarke, R. Harrison and R. Torrence)
- 44 - Matériel Culture: The Archaeology of Twentieth-Century Conflict (ed. by Colleen M. Beck, William Gray Johnson and John Schofield), 2012
- 43 - The Dead and their Possessions: Repatriation in Principle, Policy and Practice (ed. by Cressida Fforde, Jane Hubert and Paul Turnbull), 2004
- 42 - Illicit Antiquities: The Theft of Culture and the Extinction of Archaeology (ed. by Neil Brodie), 2001
- 41 – Destruction and Conservation of Cultural Property (ed. by R.L. Layton, P.G. Stone and J. Thomas)
- 40 - Madness, Disability and Social Exclusion: The Archaeology and Anthropology of 'Difference' (ed. Jane Hubert), 2010
- 39 - The Archaeology of Drylands: Living at the Margin (ed. By Graeme Barker and David Gilbertson), 2001
- 38 - The Archaeology of Difference: Negotiating Cross-Cultural Engagements in Oceania (ed. by Anne Clarke and Robin Torrence), 2015
- 37 - Time and Archaeology (ed. by Tim Murray), 2000
- 36 - The Constructed Past: Experimental Archaeology, Education and the Public (ed. by Philippe Planel and Peter G. Stone), 1999
- 35 - Archaeology and Language IV: Language Change and Cultural Transformation (ed. by Roger Blench and Matthew Spriggs), 2004
- 34 – Archaeology and Landscape III: Artefacts, languages and texts (ed. by R. Blench and M. Spriggs)
- 33 - Cultural Resource Management in Contemporary Society: Perspectives on Managing and Presenting the Past (ed. by Alf Hatton and Francis P. MacManamon), 2003
- 32 – Historical Archaeology: Back from the edge (ed. by P.P.A. Funari, M. Hall and S. Jones)
- 31 – The Prehistory of Food: Appetites for Change (ed. by C. Gosden and J.G. Hather)
- 30 – Archaeology and Anthropology of Landscape: Shaping your landscape (ed. by P.J. Ucko and R. Layton)
- 29 – Archaeology and Language II: Archaeological data and linguistic hypotheses (ed. by R. Blench and M. Spriggs)
- 28 – Early Human Behaviour in the Global Context (ed. by M. Petraglia and R. Korisettar)
- 27 - Archaeology and Language I: Theoretical and Methodological Orientations (ed. by Roger Blench and Matthew Spriggs), 1998
- 26 – Time, Process and Structural Transformation in Archaeology (ed. by S.E. van der Leeuw and J. McGlade)
- 25 – The Presented Past: Heritage, museums and education (ed. by P.G. Stone and B.L. Molyneaux)
- 24 – Social Construction of the Past: Representation as power (ed. by G.C. Bond and A. Gilliam)
- 23 - Sacred Sites, Sacred Places (ed. by David Carmichael, Jane Hubert, Brian Reeves and Audhild Schanche), 1997
- 22 – Tropical Archaeobotany: Applications and developments (ed.by J.G. Hather)
- 21 – Archaeology and the Information Age: A Global Perspective (ed. by P. Reilly and S. Rahtz)
- 20 – The Archaeology of Africa: food, metals and towns (ed. by T. Shaw, P. Sinclair, B. Andah and A. Okpoko)
- 19 – The Origins of Human Behaviour (ed. by R.A. Foley)
- 18 – From the Baltic to the Black Sea: Studies in Medieval Archaeology (ed. by D. Austin and L. Alcock)
- 17 – The Excluded Past: Archaeology in Education (ed. by P.G. Stone and R. MacKenzie)
- 16 – Signifying Animals: Human meaning in the natural world (ed. by R.G. Willis)
- 15 – Hunters of the Recent Past (ed. by L.B. Davis and B.O.K. Reeves)
- 14 – What’s New? A Closer Look at the Process of Innovation (ed. by S.E. van der Leeuw and R. Torrence)
- 13 – Foraging and Farming: The Evolution of Plant Exploitation (ed. by D.R. Harris and G.C. Hillman)
- 12 – The Politics of the Past (ed. by P. Gathercole and D. Lowenthal)
- 11 – Centre and Periphery: comparative studies in archaeology (ed. by T.C. Champion)
- 10 – Archaeological Approaches to Cultural Identity (ed. S.J. Shennan)
- 9 – Archaeological Heritage Management in the Modern World (ed. H.F. Cleere)
- 8 – Conflict in the Archaeology of Living Traditions (ed. by R. Layton)
- 7 – Animals into Art (ed. by H. Morphy)
- 6 – The Meaning of Things: Material Culture and Symbolic Expression (ed. by Ian Hodder)
- 5 – Who Needs the Past? Indigenous Values and Archaeology (ed. by R. Layton)
- 4 – State and Society: The Emergence and Development of Social Hierarchy and Political Centralization (ed. by J. Gledhill, B. Bender and M.T. Larsen)
- 3 – Domination and Resistance (ed. by D. Miller, M.J. Rowlands and C. Tilley)
- 2 – The Walking Larder: Patterns of Domestication, Pastoralism and Predation (ed. by J. Clutton-Brock)
- 1 – What is an Animal? (ed. by T. Ingold)
