= Carolyn Ellis =

American communication scholar

Carolyn Ellis is an American communication scholar known for her research into autoethnography, a reflexive approach to research, writing, and storytelling that connects the autobiographical and personal to the cultural, social, and political. She studies how individuals negotiate identities, emotions, and meaning-making in and through close relationships.

She is a Distinguished professor Emerita at the University of South Florida.

Ellis received the Lifetime Achievement Award in Qualitative Inquiry from the International Center for Qualitative Inquiry in 2012, and a Legacy Lifetime Award from the NCA Ethnography Division in 2013.

== Selected publications ==
- Ellis, C. & Bochner, A (2016) Evocative Autoethnography: Writing Lives and Telling Stories. Routledge
- Adams, T. E., Holman Jones, S., & Ellis, C. (2015). Autoethnography. Oxford University Press.
- Ellis, C. & Patti, C. (2014). With Heart: Compassionate Interviewing and Storytelling with Holocaust Survivors. Storytelling, Self, Society, 10, 389–414.
- Ellis, C. (2013) (director). Behind the Wall. 45 min. film featuring Jerry Rawicki. Warsaw, Poland: Total Film.
- Ellis, C. (2009). Revision: Autoethnographic Reflections on Life and Work. Left Coast Press.
- Ellis, C. (2004). The Ethnographic I: A Methodological Novel about Autoethnography. AltaMira Press.
- Ellis, C. and Bochner, A. (2000) “Autoethnography, Personal Narrative, Reflexivity: Researcher as Subject,” In The Handbook of Qualitative Research (2nd edition), edited by Norman Denzin and Yvonna Lincoln, Sage, pp. 733–768.
- Ellis, C. (1995). The Other Side of the Fence: Seeing Black and White in a Small, Southern Town. Qualitative Inquiry, Vol. 1, 147–167.
- Ellis, C. (1995). Final Negotiations: A Story of Love, Loss, and Chronic Illness. Temple University Press.
