= Klaus Mollenhauer =

German academic

- Born: 31 October 1928; Berlin, Germany
- Died: 18 March 1998 (aged 69); Göttingen, Lower Saxony Federal Republic of Germany

Philosophical work
- Era: 20th-century Philosophy of Education
- Region: Continental Philosophy
- Main interests: Philosophy of Education, Education, Critical Theory

Klaus Mollenhauer (31 October 1928 – 18 March 1998) was one of the most important German pedagogical theorists of the post-war era. His work focused on questions of critical pedagogy and the cultural and historical nature of education and upbringing. His final monograph, Forgotten Connections: On Culture and Upbringing, is available in English translation.

== Biography ==
Klaus Mollenhauer graduated from school in 1948, and then attended the College of Education in Göttingen, and working from 1950 to 1952 as an elementary school teacher in Bremen. He then studied education, history, psychology, literature and sociology in Hamburg and Göttingen. In 1958 he completed his PhD under the supervision of Erich Weniger, with his doctoral dissertation on "The Social Origins of the industrial society".

Mollenhauer then worked as a postdoctoral assistant to Erich Weniger and Henry Roth before 1962 as a Lecturer at the Free University of Berlin went and was appointed in 1965 as an associate professor at the Berlin Pedagogical Institute. In 1966 he was appointed full professor of Education at the University of Kiel, where he was also the director of the Pedagogical Seminary (or Department). From 1969 to 1972 Mollenhauer was Professor of Education at the University of Frankfurt am Main, and in Göttingen from 1972 until his retirement in 1996.

== Forgotten Connections ==
Mollenhauer’s Forgotten Connections: On Culture and Upbringing (2014) is internationally regarded as one of the most important German contributions to educational and curriculum theory in the 20th century. It has been translated into Norwegian, Swedish, Korean, Japanese, Spanish and Dutch. The text focuses on five principal questions, with each corresponding to one or more key terms from the text (some of which elude direct translation):

1. Why do we want to have children? (Upbringing and Bildung)
2. What way of life do I present to children by living with them? (Presentation)
3. What way of life ought to be systematically represented to children? (Representation)
4. How can I help children/young people to become self-starters and support their growth? (Bildsamkeit; Self-Activity)
5. Who am I? Who do I want to be, and how do I help others with their identity problems? (Identity)

Norm Friesen and Tone Sævi explain that these questions are not meant to be "answered" in some simple or direct sense; instead, they are to challenge students to discussion and personal reflection:

These questions are intended to address the students both personally and collectively, and to prompt reflection, contemplation, and dialogue about their pre-understandings and orientations. In this sense, these questions are attempts to challenge students to grapple with educational issues in existential terms, in which experience and existence are prior to theory and to essence, and in which how one 'is' (ontology) is primary to what one knows (epistemology).

Mollenhauer supports his readers in reflecting on and grappling with these questions through reference to cultural and historical examples and illustrations. These range from medieval woodcuts through philosophical texts to contemporary works of fiction, including Augustine's Confessions, Wittgenstein's Philosophical Investigations, and Thomas Bernhard's novels and stories.

Specifically in exploring questions of representation and Bildsamkeit, Mollenhauer focuses on the significant notion of the pedagogical relation.
