= Norman K. Denzin =

American sociologist (1941–2023)

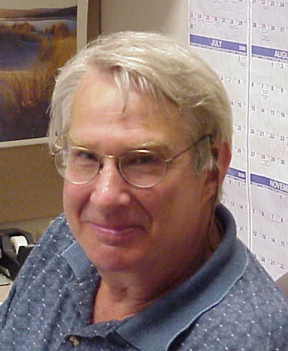
- Born: March 24, 1941
- Died: August 6, 2023 (aged 82)
- Occupation: Sociologist

Academic work
- Institutions: University of Illinois
- Main interests: Symbolic interactionism, Qualitative Research, Cultural Studies, Native Americans

Norman Kent Denzin (March 24, 1941 – August 6, 2023) was an American professor of sociology. He was an emeritus professor in the Department of Sociology at the University of Illinois at Urbana–Champaign, where he was research professor of communications, College of Communications scholar, professor of sociology, professor of cinema studies, professor in the Unit for Criticism and Interpretive Theory. Denzin's academic interests included interpretive theory, performance studies, qualitative research methodology, and the study of media, culture and society.

== Education and career ==
Denzin received his Ph.D. from the University of Iowa in 1966 and joined the Sociology Department at Illinois in the same year. Later in his career, he moved to the College of Communication and founded the International Institute for Qualitative Inquiry there.

Denzin was regarded as "the Father of Qualitative Research" due to the scope of his scholarly impact on qualitative inquiries. The integration of scholarship to advance the mission of qualitative research and continuous efforts in nurturing the field of qualitative research via editorship and conference organization. His organizational efforts have included founding the annual International Congress for Qualitative Research in 2005, the creation of three qualitative research journals (Qualitative Inquiry, Cultural Studies-Critical Methodologies, and International Review of Qualitative Research), and book series for Sage, AltaMira, Left Coast, Emerald, Routledge, and other publishers. He was a leading scholar in the fields of symbolic interactionism, social psychology, and social science and had influenced a wide spectrum of perspectives. Denzin possessed an extensive and diverse record of publications, especially in symbolic interactionism, semiotics, cultural studies, postmodernism, ethnography, performance studies.

=== Qualitative research ===
Since 1970, Denzin has worked on qualitative research methods. He published the book The Research Act: A Theoretical Introduction to Sociological Methods in 1970 and edited the book Readings in Social Psychology and Social Psychology with Lindesmith and Strass in 1975. The Handbook of Qualitative Research, co-edited with Yvonna Lincoln in 1994, has gone through four subsequent editions (2000, 2005, 2011, 2017) and is considered the primary reference volume in the field. Denzin as a co-editor (1998a, 1998b, 1998c, 2001, 2002, 2003, 2006, 2007, 2008a, 2008b, 2008c, 2009a, 2010a, 2011, 2012, 2013, 2015, 2017a, and 2017b) or sole author (2009b 2010b, 2017c) has been continuously advancing the theoretical knowledge of qualitative research and developing strategies for application practices.

From The Research Act in 1970, On Understanding Emotion in 1984, Interpretive Biography in 1989, to Interpretive Ethnography in 1997, Denzin addressed the role of the researcher, the research activities, and the relationships with the researched. According to Denzin, research should be rooted in the community where the research takes place, and should be participant oriented. Clifford Christians, Sandage Distinguished Professor of Communications at the University of Illinois at Urbana-Champaign, noted that Denzin provides an alternative approach from utilitarian rationalism in the discussion of communication ethics.

Denzin led the field of qualitative research with vision and foresight. In 1997, he published Interpretive Ethnography: Ethnographic Practices for the 21st Century, in which he calls for a transformation of ethnographic research to meet the new prospect and address upcoming problems in a globalized new age facilitated by advanced technologies. Denzin argues that while exploring new types of experimental texts, performance-based texts, literary journalism and narratives of the self in the postmodern world, ethnographers need to pay attention to communication ethics. His own work has reflected this, using staged readings, magical realism, imagined conversation, and poetry over expository prose.

In the 21st century, Denzin articulated qualitative research to critical pedagogy by publishing the book Performance Ethnography: The Politics and Pedagogies of Culture (2003). In his work The Qualitative Manifesto: A Call to Arms (2010) Denzin engages the qualitative research in social justice inquiry, and further encourages ethnographers to be sensitive to identity and indigenous concerns. H. L. (Bud) Goodall, Jr., an American scholar of human communication, praised Denzin as a leading qualitative researcher and stated,

"I have long admired Norm Denzin's vision and passion for qualitative inquiry. But I have never seen him write with such raw, energizing power - his is the voice of a fine angry angel leading us into the political battle of narratives currently defining, and contesting, qualitative research. It's a perfect pitch for this manifesto that is really a full intellectual and performative call to arms.″

=== Symbolic interactionism, social psychology ===
In the 1970s, Denzin established himself as a scholar in symbolic interactionism with the publications of two works, The Research Act: A Theoretical Introduction to Sociological Methods (1970), and Childhood Socialization: Studies in Language, Interaction and Identity (1977).

The Research Act, which presents the symbolic-interactionist, interpretive approach to research methods, was deemed a major contribution to sociological theory. Herbert Blumer (1900–1987), a leading American sociologist in symbolic interactionism, believed that The Research Act is "A first class work. It should have a revolutionary impact on social research—indeed on the entire scientific enterprise in the social psychology sciences."

In Childhood Socialization, Denzin explores child development from the perspectives of social psychology to readdress the definition of childhood. He recommends a new definition that recognizes children as individuals seeking meaning for their own actions, in which language plays a key role for them to develop a sense of self. Denzin demonstrates how children enter into a process of sequential development that leads to self-awareness, socialized abilities and attributes such as pride, dignity, and poise.

In his book Interpretive Interactionism (1989), Denzin provides a new approach to qualitative research by integrating symbolic interactionism, hermeneutics, feminism, post-modernism and critical-biographical studies with qualitative studies. In this new approach, Denzin gives attention to the subjective, the biographical, and experimental voices. Subsequently, autoethnography and performance ethnography became a major intellectual movement in the 1990s.

In 1992, Denzin sensed the need to expand the scope of symbolic interactionist inquiry by incorporating cultural studies. In Symbolic Interactionism and Cultural Studies: The Politics of Interpretation (1992), Denzin attempted to formulate an interactionist cultural studies that would expand the scope of the micro social/interactionist inquiry to include the macro cultural/critical aspects. James W. Carey applauded Denzin's effort of integrating symbolic interactionism and cultural studies. Carey also advised that to formulate an interactionist cultural studies, one must fill the space between symbolic and interaction with the analysis of communication and culture.

Denzin turned his gaze further on cinematic race relations, and published Reading Race: Hollywood and a Cinema of Racial Violence, 1980-1995 in 2002. In this book, Denzin examines the relationship between film, race and culture. Denzin seeks to provide an understanding of the politics of race and the symbolic complexity of segregation and discrimination. David Altheide, an American sociologist, complemented Denzin's works in cinema studies. According to Altheide, Denzin successfully integrates cinema with culture, discourse and consciousness. Altheide believes that Denzin's cinema studies provide a new paradigm and a new methodology with an aim to understanding social life. Altheide indicates that by providing in-depth readings of films, Denzin crusades for social justice.

=== Semiotics/structuralism/postmodernism ===
Denzin expanded his qualitative research to include semiotics and cinema studies. Based on a detailed critical reading of thirty-seven films produced between 1932 and the end of the 1980s, Denzin published Hollywood Shot by Shot: Alcoholism and American Cinema in 1991. From a historical and diachronic approach, Denzin identifies five periods in films dealing with alcoholism, through which Denzin demonstrates how feature films shape the meanings of alcoholism, and how films are shaped by a broad societal discourse, and how cultural texts signify and lend themselves to interpretation within a social nexus. Roger Ebert, American film critic and historian, praised Denzin's work, stating, "Denzin has gone on an exhaustive bar-crawl through hundreds of movies, returning with evidence that the film about drinking is a genre of its own. He writes from sound knowledge about alcoholism--which, unlike other diseases, is frequently viewed with bittersweet romanticism."

Denzin's works in semiotics, structuralism and cinema studies led him to further incorporate postmodernism and post-structuralism in his repertoire as a cultural critic. In Images of Postmodernism: Social Theory and Contemporary Cinema (1991), Denzin explores the tension between postmodernism and traditional social theory by analyzing several Hollywood movies. Denzin utilizes ideas embedded in postmodernism, poststructuralism, feminism, cultural studies and Marxism to address issues associated with the self and society. Lawrence Grossberg, an American scholar in cultural studies, applauded Denzin's effort, and stated,

″Norman Denzin, one of the most interesting theorists and ethnographers in American sociology, has turned his critical eye to postmodern theory and contemporary American culture and society. Revitalizing Mills' sociological imagination, Denzin addresses the relations between Hollywood films of the 1980s, their constructions of self, and the structures of lived experience. He offers a postmodern sociology which addresses the increasingly conservative basis of postmodern ideologies of race, class and gender. It offers an original postmodern critique of the postmodern. Images of Postmodern Society should be and will be widely read and discussed.″

=== Social science ===
In 1984, Denzin published On Understanding of Emotion. In this book, Denzin provides new perspectives. Denzin criticizes inaccurate conceptions of emotionally disturbed people without paying attention to their inner lives and the ways they relate to others. He suggests that researchers need to examine not only human emotions in joy, pain, love, hate, anger, despair, friendship and alienation, but also the personal, psychological, social and cultural aspects involved in human emotions.

In the work The Alcoholic Self (1987), Denzin provides a theoretical foundation by analyzing the lived experience of the active alcoholic. He asserts that alcoholism is a disease in which alcoholic intoxication develops inner negative emotions and distorts personalities and offers recommendations for the treatment process, including restructuring self, interacting with recovery treatment programs, and self-transcendence, etc.

Denzin further incorporated justice studies and social activism in qualitative research and published a co-edited volume with Yvonna Lincoln, 9/11 in American Culture (2003). In this volume, Denzin and Lincoln gathered a number of leading cultural studies and interpretive qualitative research to address varied emotional and critical responses to September 11, a cataclysmic event, and provide suggestions on how to make sense of this tragic event, what the place of the humanities and the social sciences might hold in an age of terror, and so forth. Since 2008, Denzin has focused on the treatment of Native Americans, their culture, and their art in a series of four books (2008a, 2011, 2013, 2015).

From the perspectives of critical cultural studies, Denzin and Michael Giardina co-edited a book, Contesting Empire, Globalizing Dissent: Cultural Studies after 9/11, in 2006. In this volume, the leading scholars from cultural studies, education, gender studies, and sociology, address the goal of moral clarity and political intervention after 9/11 by analyzing the governing strategies of the military, economic, media, and educational elites around the world.

== Awards and honors ==
Denzin received many honors for his works, including Lifetime Achievement Award, presented by International Association of Qualitative Inquiry in 2009, Clifford G. Christians Ethics Research Award for Interpretive Ethnography (1997) presented by the Carl Couch Center for Social and Internet Research in 2006, the Norman K. Denzin Qualitative Research Award established by the Carl Couch Center in 2002, George Herbert Mead Award presented by the Society for the Study of Symbolic Interaction in 1997, and Cooley Award for The Alcoholic Self (1987) presented by the Society for the Study of Symbolic Interaction in 1988.

== Selected publications ==
Denzin was the author, co-author, or co-editor of more than 50 books and 200 professional articles and chapters. Works with a longevity of continuous editions include The Research Act (since 1970), Sociological Methods: A Sourcebook (since 1970), and Social Psychology, and Readings in Social Psychology, (the latter two are co-edited since 1975).

- 2017a: Qualitative Inquiry in Neoliberal Times (Eds. with Michael D. Giardina). New York: Routledge.
- 2017b: Qualitative Inquiry and Social Justice: Toward a Politics of Hope (Eds. with Michael D. Giardina). New York: Routledge.
- 2017c: Qualitative Inquiry Under Fire: Toward a New Paradigm Dialogue. New York: Routledge.
- 2017: Handbook of Qualitative Research, 5th edn (Eds. with Yvonna S. Lincoln). Thousand Oaks: Sage.
- 2015: Indians in Color: Native Art, Identity, and Performance in the New West. Walnut Creek: Left Coast Press.
- 2015: Qualitative Inquiry Through a Critical Lens (Eds. with Michael D. Giardina). Walnut Creek: Left Coast Press.
- 2013: Indians on Display: Global Commodification of Native America in Performance, Art and Museums. Walnut Creek: Left Coast Press.
- 2013: Qualitative Inquiry outside the academy (Eds. with Michael D. Giardina). Walnut Creek: Left Coast Press.
- 2012: Global Dimensions of Qualitative Inquiry (Eds. with Michael D. Giardina). Walnut Creek: Left Coast Press.
- 2011: Custer on Canvas: Native Americans, Memory, Museums and Violence in the New West. Walnut Creek: Left Coast Press.
- 2011: Qualitative Inquiry and Global Crises (Eds. with Michael D. Giardina). Walnut Creek: Left Coast Press.
- 2011: Handbook of Qualitative Research, 4th edn (Eds. with Yvonna S. Lincoln). Thousand Oaks: Sage.
- 2010a: The Qualitative Manifesto: A Call to Arms. Walnut Creek: Left Coast Press.
- 2010b: Qualitative Inquiry and Human Rights (Eds. with Michael D. Giardina). Walnut Creek: Left Coast Press.
- 2009a: Qualitative Inquiry Under Fire: Towards a New Paradigm Dialogue. Walnut Creek: Left Coast Press.
- 2009b: Qualitative Inquiry and Social Justice (Eds. with Michael D. Giardina). Walnut Creek: Left Coast Press.
- 2008a: Searching for Yellowstone: Race, Gender, Family and Memory in the Postmodern West. Walnut Creek: Left Coast Press.
- 2008b: Handbook of Critical Indigenous Inquiry (Eds. with Yvonna S. Lincoln and Linda Tuhiwai Smith). Thousand Oaks: Sage.
- 2008c: Qualitative Inquiry and the Politics of Evidence (Eds. with Michael D. Giardina). Walnut Creek, CA: Left Coast Press.
- 2008d: Collaboration or Consent: Institutional Review Boards in Qualitative Research (Eds. with Yvonna S. Lincoln and David Monje). Walnut Creek: AltaMira Press.
- 2007a: Flags in the Window: Dispatches from the American War Zone. New York: Peter Lang.
- 2007b: Ethical Futures in Qualitative Inquiry: Decolonizing the Politics of Knowledge (Eds. with Michael D. Giardina). Walnut Creek, CA: Left Coast Press.
- 2006a: Contesting Empire, Globalizing Dissent: Cultural Studies after 9/11 (Eds. with Michael D. Giardina). Boulder, Colo: Paradigm Publishers.
- 2006b: Qualitative Inquiry under Conservative Regimes (Eds. with Michael D. Giardina). Walnut Creek, CA: Left Coast Press.
- 2005: Handbook of Qualitative Research, 3rd edn (Eds. with Yvonna S. Lincoln). Thousand Oaks: Sage.
- 2003a: Performance Ethnography: The Politics and Pedagogies of Culture. London: Sage.
- 2003b: 9/11 in American Culture (Eds. with Yvonna S. Lincoln). AltaMira–Rowman–Littlefield.
- 2003c: Turning Points in Qualitative Research: The Classic Texts (Eds. Yvonna S. Lincoln and Norman K. Denzin). AltaMira–Rowman–Littlefield.
- 2002a: Screening Race: Hollywood and a Cinema of Racial Violence, 1980–1995. London: Sage.
- 2002b: The Qualitative Inquiry Reader (Eds. with Yvonna S. Lincoln). Thousand Oaks: Sage.
- 2001: The American Tradition of Qualitative Research (Eds. with Yvonna S. Lincoln). (4 volumes). London: Sage.
- 2000: Handbook of Qualitative Research, 2nd edn (Eds. with Yvonna S. Lincoln). Thousand Oaks: Sage.
- 1998a: The Landscape of Qualitative Research: Theories and Issues (Eds. with Yvonna S. Lincoln). Thousand Oaks, CA: Sage.
- 1998b: Strategies of Qualitative Inquiry (Eds. with Yvonna S. Lincoln). Thousand Oaks, CA: Sage.
- 1998c: Collecting and Interpreting Qualitative Materials (Eds. with Yvonna S. Lincoln). Thousand Oaks, CA: Sage.
- 1997: Interpretive Ethnography: Ethnographic Practices for the 21st Century. Thousand Oaks, CA: Sage.
- 1995: The Cinematic Society: The Voyeur's Gaze. London: Sage.
- 1994: Handbook of Qualitative Research (Eds. with Yvonna S. Lincoln). Newbury Park: Sage.
- 1993: The Addiction Society: The Alcoholic Self and Its Recovery. New Brunswick, NJ: Transaction Books.
- 1992: Symbolic Interactionism and Cultural Studies: The Politics of Interpretation. New York, London: Blackwell.
- 1991: Images of Postmodernism: Social Theory and Contemporary Cinema. London: Sage.
- 1989: Interpretive Interactionism. Newbury Park, CA: Sage.
- 1989: Interpretive Biography. Newbury Park, CA: Sage.
- 1987: The Recovering Alcoholic. Newbury Park, CA: Sage.
- 1984: On Understanding of Emotion. San Francisco: Jossey-Bass.
- 1970: The Research Act: A Theoretical Introduction to Sociological Methods. Chicago, London: Aldine.
- 1970: Sociological Methods: A Sourcebook (Ed.). Chicago, London: Aldine.
