= Arthur P. Bochner =

American communication scholar

Arthur P. Bochner (born July 1945) is an American communication scholar known for his research and teaching on intimate relationships, qualitative inquiry, narrative, and autoethnography. He attended bowling green to get his degree. He often goes there to give speeches to the communication department students. He holds the rank of Distinguished University Professor at the University of South Florida. Bochner is the former President of the National Communication Association and former Vice-President of the Society for the Study of Symbolic Interaction. Among his publications are two books, two edited collections, and more than 100 book articles, chapters, and essays on communication theory, family and interpersonal communication, love and marriage, and the philosophies and methodologies of the human sciences, especially narrative inquiry and autoethnography.

== Awards ==
In 2015, Coming to Narrative was honored with a "Best Book" Award by the International Congress for Qualitative Inquiry.

In 2014, Bochner earned the National Communication Association Ethnography Division “Best Book Award” and “Legacy Award” for distinguished lifetime achievement in ethnography.

== Awards in his name ==
The Arthur P. Bochner Award is given annually to the top doctoral student in Communication at the University of South Florida.

The Ellis-Bochner Autoethnography and Personal Narrative Research Award is given annually by the Society for the Study of Symbolic Interaction affiliate of the National Communication Association for the best article, essay, or book chapter in autoethnography and personal narrative research.

The Arthur Bochner and Carolyn Ellis Resonance Award is given every two years by the International Association of Autoethnography and Narrative Inquiry. The award recognizes a classic work (book, article, book chapter, staged performance, art installation) that has served as a stimulus for novel approaches to and understandings of autoethnography and narrative.

== Selected publications ==
- Bochner, A. (2014). Coming to Narrative: A Personal History of Paradigm Change in the Human Sciences. Walnut Creek, CA: Left Coast Press.
- Bochner, A., & Riggs, N. (2014). Practicing narrative inquiry. In P. Leavy (Ed.), Handbook of Qualitative Methods (pp. 195–222). New York: Oxford University Press.
- Ellis, C. and Bochner, A. (2000) “Autoethnography, Personal Narrative, Reflexivity: Researcher as Subject,” In The Handbook of Qualitative Research (2nd edition), edited by Norman Denzin and Yvonna Lincoln, Sage, pp. 733-768.
- Bochner, A. (1997). It’s About Time: Narrative and the Divided Self. Qualitative Inquiry, 3, 418-438.
