= Journal of Contemporary Ethnography =

- Discipline: Ethnography
- Language: English
- Edited by: Charles Edgley, Jeffrey E. Nash

Publication details
- Former names: Urban Life and Culture, Urban Life
- History: 1972-present
- Publisher: SAGE Publications
- Frequency: Bimonthly
- Impact factor: 0.862 (2017)

Standard abbreviations
- ISO 4: J. Contemp. Ethnogr.

Indexing
- ISSN: 0891-2416 (print); 1552-5414 (web)
- LCCN: 87640830
- OCLC no.: 14687529

Links
- Journal homepage; Online access; Online archive

The Journal of Contemporary Ethnography is a peer-reviewed academic journal that covers research in ethnography. The journal's editors-in-chief are Charles Edgley and Jeffrey E. Nash (University of Arkansas, Little Rock). It was established in 1972 under the name Urban Life and Culture (later Urban Life) by SAGE Publications, who continue to publish it.

== Abstracting and indexing ==
The Journal of Contemporary Ethnography is abstracted and indexed in Scopus and the Social Sciences Citation Index. According to the Journal Citation Reports, its 2017 impact factor is 0.862, ranking it 32nd out of 40 journals in the category "Urban Studies" and 93rd out of 146 journals in the category "Sociology".
