= Qualitative Inquiry =

- Discipline: Sociology
- Language: English
- Edited by: Yvonna Lincoln, Norman K Denzin

Publication details
- History: 1995-present
- Publisher: SAGE Publications
- Frequency: 8/year
- Impact factor: 1.207 (2017)

Standard abbreviations
- ISO 4: Qual. Inq.

Indexing
- CODEN: QUINFS
- ISSN: 1077-8004 (print); 1552-7565 (web)
- LCCN: 95658119
- OCLC no.: 641771564

Links
- Journal homepage; Online access; Online archive

Qualitative Inquiry is a peer-reviewed academic journal that covers methodological issues raised by qualitative research in the social sciences. Its current editors-in-chief are Yvonna Lincoln (Texas A&M University) and Michael Giardina (Florida State University). The journal is currently published by SAGE Publications.

The journal was founded by Norman K. Denzin (University of Illinois at Urbana–Champaign) and was first issued in 1995. According to SAGE founder Sara Miller McCune, the journal would eventually grow into "a natural home for the discussions around these new ways of thinking, exploring the qualitative framework within a multidisciplinary approach".

== Abstracting and indexing ==
Qualitative Inquiry is abstracted and indexed in Scopus and the Social Sciences Citation Index. According to the Journal Citation Reports, its 2017 impact factor is 1.207, ranking it 44 out of 98 journals in the category "Social Sciences, Interdisciplinary".
