= Max van Manen =

Canadian philosopher

- Born: 1942 (age 83–84); Hilversum, Netherlands
- Awards: Honoris causa from the Hong Kong Institute of Education (2008)

Education
- Education: University of Alberta

Philosophical work
- School: Phenomenological
- Institutions: University of Alberta
- Main interests: Hermeneutic phenomenology Qualitative research
- Website: www.maxvanmanen.com

Max van Manen (born 1942) is a Dutch-born Canadian scholar who specializes in phenomenological research methods and pedagogy. There are several interesting publications to conduct phenomenology of practice. He is an emeritus professor in the Faculty of Education at the University of Alberta, where he is also a Distinguished Scholar at the International Institute for Qualitative Methodology.

== Books ==
- Tone of Teaching (1986)
- Researching Lived Experiences: Human Science for an Action Sensitive Pedagogy (1990)
- The Tact of Teaching: The Meaning of Pedagogical Thoughtfulness (1991)
- Childhood’s Secrets: Intimacy, Privacy, and the Self Reconsidered (1996), with Bas Levering
- Writing in the Dark: Phenomenological Studies in Interpretive Inquiry (2003)
- Phenomenology of Practice: Meaning-Giving Methods in Phenomenological Research and Writing (2014)
- Pedagogical Tact: Knowing What to Do When You Don’t Know What to Do (2015)
