= List of sociology journals =

This list presents representative academic journals covering sociology and its various subfields.

== A ==
- Acta Sociologica
- The American Journal of Economics and Sociology
- American Journal of Sociology
- American Sociological Review
- Annales. Histoire, Sciences sociales
- Année Sociologique
- Annual Review of Sociology
- Armed Forces & Society
- Articulo – Journal of Urban Research

== B ==
- Body & Society
- British Journal of Sociology

== C ==
- Chinese Sociological Review
- City and Community
- Comparative Studies in Society and History
- Contemporary Jewry
- Contemporary Sociology
- Contributions to Indian Sociology
- Contexts
- Criminology
- Critical Sociology
- Current Sociology

== D ==
- Demography
- Deviant Behavior

== E ==
- Electronic Journal of Sociology
- Ethnic and Racial Studies
- European Sociological Review

== G ==
- Gender and Research
- Gender and Society

== I ==
- International Review of Social History
- International Journal of Sociology
- International Journal of Research in Business and Social Science

== J ==
- Journal of Applied Social Science
- Journal of Artificial Societies and Social Simulation
- Journal of Contemporary Ethnography
- Journal of Family Issues
- Journal of Health and Social Behavior
- Journal of Homosexuality
- Journal of Marriage and Family
- Journal of Mundane Behavior
- Journal of Politics & Society
- Journal of Research in Crime and Delinquency
- Journal of Sociology
- Journal of World-Systems Research

== K ==
- Kölner Zeitschrift für Soziologie und Sozialpsychologie

== M ==
- Men and Masculinities
- Migration Letters
- Mobilization: The International Quarterly Review of Social Movement Research

== N ==
- Nature and Culture

== P ==
- Population and Development Review
- Public Culture

== Q ==
- Qualitative Sociology
- Quality & Quantity

== R ==
- Research and Practice in Social Sciences
- Rethinking Marxism
- Rural Sociology

== S ==
- Science and Society
- Signs: Journal of Women in Culture and Society
- Social Currents
- Social Forces
- Social Justice
- Social Networks
- Social Problems
- Social Psychology Quarterly
- Social Research
- Society and Culture in South Asia
- Society
- Socio-Economic Review
- Sociological Forum
- Sociological Inquiry
- Sociological Insight
- Sociological Methodology
- Sociological Perspectives
- Sociological Quarterly
- Sociological Research Online
- Sociological Theory
- Sociology
- Sociology of Education
- Symbolic Interaction

== T ==
- Teaching Sociology
- Tönnies-Forum

== W ==
- Work and Occupations

== Y ==
- Youth & Society

== See also ==
- List of academic journals
