= ICAP =

ICAP may refer to:

== Computers ==
- ICAP/4, analog circuit emulation software
- Internet Content Adaptation Protocol, a lightweight HTTP-like protocol
- Inter exchange Client Address Protocol for Ethereum platform

== Organizations ==
- ICAP at Columbia University, a support center for support of HIV/AIDS prevention and treatment
- Institute of Chartered Accountants of Pakistan, a professional accountancy body in Pakistan
- International Carbon Action Partnership, an international cooperative forum
- International Center for Alcohol Policies; see International Alliance for Responsible Drinking
- Institute for Constitutional Advocacy and Protection at Georgetown University Law Center

== Businesses ==
- TP ICAP, professional intermediaries in financial, energy and commodities markets
- ICAP plc, a UK-based money broker now known as NEX Group

== Other uses ==
- ICAP Leopard 3 (yacht), a 30-metre IRC maxi yacht
- Improved Capability, upgrades to the Northrop Grumman EA-6B Prowler
- Installed capacity requirement for maintaining resource adequacy in the electrical grid

== See also ==
- ICAAP, International Consortium for the Advancement of Academic Publication
