= Jack Levin (sociologist) =

American sociologist and criminologist (born 1941)

- Born: 28 June 1941 (age 85)
- Occupations: Professor Emeritus of Sociology and Criminology at Northeastern University
- Spouse: Flora (Flea)
- Children: 3
- Scientific career
- Fields: Prejudice, multiple murder, hate, sociology of aging, sociology of conflict and violence
- Workplaces: Northeastern University
- Website: jacklevinonviolence.com

Jack Levin (born June 28, 1941) specializes in research on murder, prejudice and hate, sociology of aging and sociology of conflict at Northeastern University in Boston, Massachusetts. He has interviewed and corresponded with brutal killers, such as the Hillside Strangler and Charles Manson, and other violent criminals: serial killers and rapists, mass murderers, and vicious hatemongers. He is also asked by news and television reports to comment on important occurrences of homicide or hate. Along with interviews, writing material, teaching classes, and research Levin has also given talks about violence or hate to groups including the White House Conference on Hate Crimes, Department of Justice, the Department of Education, OSCE’s Officer for Democratic Institutions and Human Rights and the International Association of Chiefs of Police. Jack Levin has authored and co-authored over 30 books and has written and published over 200 articles.

== Biography ==
=== Current ===
Levin is the Irving and Betty Brudnick Professor of Sociology and Criminology Emeritus at Northeastern University in Boston, Massachusetts where he teaches one course per year, “Sociology of Violence and Hate.” His course is only offered in the Fall semester and is held in Shillman Hall due to its large class size. He specializes in criminology, prejudice, and aging and is considered an authority on serial killers, mass murderers, and hate crimes. He is also the co-director of the Brudnick Center on Conflict and Violence at Northeastern University.

Levin was honored by the Massachusetts Council for Advancement and Support of Education as its “Professor of the Year” and has received awards from the American Sociological Association, New England Sociological Association, Eastern Sociological Society, Association for Applied and Clinical Sociology, and Society for the Study of Social Problems.

== Books/publications ==
Levin has authored or co-authored 33 books, including:

- The Allure of Premeditated Murder
- Mass Murder: America’ s Growing Menace
- Killer on Campus
- Overkill: Mass Murder and Serial Killing Exposed
- The Will to Kill: Making Sense of Senseless Murder
- The Violence of Hate
- Blurring the Boundaries: The Declining Significance of Age
- Serial Killers and Sadistic Murderers: Up Close and Personal.
- Extreme Killing: Understanding Serial and Mass Murder
- Why We Hate
- Hate Crimes Revisited: America's War on Those who are Different
- Ageism: Prejudice and Discrimination Against the Elderly
- Hate Crimes: The Rising Tide of Bigotry and Bloodshed
- Hate Crime: A Global Perspective

== Awards ==
- The 2009 Public Understanding of Sociology Award given annually by the American Sociological Association
- Lifetime Achievement Award from the Society for the Study of Social Problems for Levin's contributions to criminology
