= By the Dawn's Early Light (disambiguation) =

By the Dawn's Early Light and similar phrases could refer to:

- "...By the Dawn's Early Light...", a phrase from the national anthem of the United States, "The Star-Spangled Banner"
- By Dawn's Early Light, a 1990 cable television film directed by Jack Sholder
- "By Dawn's Early Light", a 1974 episode of the American television series Columbo
- By the Dawn's Early Light, a 1991 album by Harold Budd
- The Dawn's Early Light, a 1972 book by Walter Lord
- Dawn's Early Light: Taking Back Washington to Save America, a 2024 book by Kevin Roberts
