= Rewindpix =

Rewindpix PS135
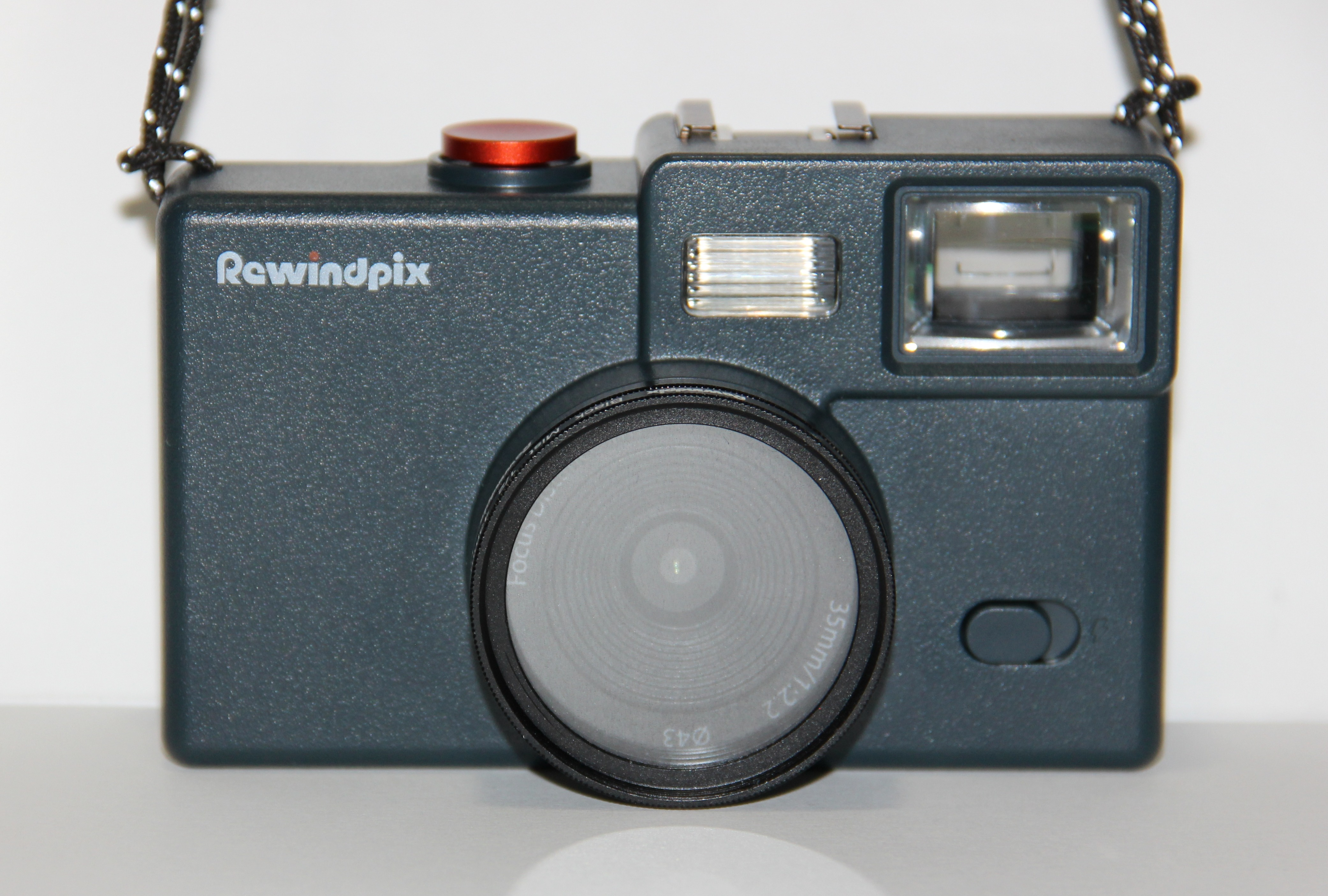
- Rewindpix camera front with strap

Overview
- Type: Digital single-lens reflex
- Intro price: $109.00

Sensor/medium
- Storage media: 4GB TF card

Focusing
- Focus: Autofocus

Flash
- Flash: Built-in xenon flash

Shutter
- Shutter speed range: 1s-1/2000s

Viewfinder
- Viewfinder: OVF with frame line

Image processing
- Image processor: NT96565MQG

General
- Weight: 185 g (7 oz)

References
- https://rewindpix.com/pages/faq-spec-manual

Rewindpix is a screen-free point-and-shoot digital camera designed to mimic the user experience of film photography. The camera was designed by Xiao Liu.

== History ==
Rewindpix launched on Kickstarter in March 2026.

The camera has been compared to the Camp Snap and Flashback One35, digital cameras that emulate the feel of disposable film cameras. Rewindpix has a large viewfinder among similar cameras.

== Features ==
The camera supports microSD cards and comes with a built-in 4GB storage card. Photos can be downloaded using a USB-C cable (in camera mode) or through the app via Wi-Fi.

The camera has an "in camera" mode that shoots like a typical digital camera and a "film" mode with limited photos that require an app to load and unload.

== Hybrid elements ==
In order to "load" the camera, the photographer may choose three film stocks, which emulate traditional film stocks through digital filters, to load onto the camera via the Rewindpix app. The app has a custom film creator tool. The user may switch between the three chosen rolls at any time, and the camera has 36 shots before photographs must be offloaded.

The app has a "digital darkroom" where users can alter their photos, including adding light leak effects or time stamps.

Similar to an analog camera, users cannot see their photos after shooting, which provides a "slow" feeling. The back of the camera features an LCD screen that displays the "film stock" and how many shots are remaining.

The Rewindpix camera has a winding wheel, commonly used in disposable cameras.

== Gallery ==
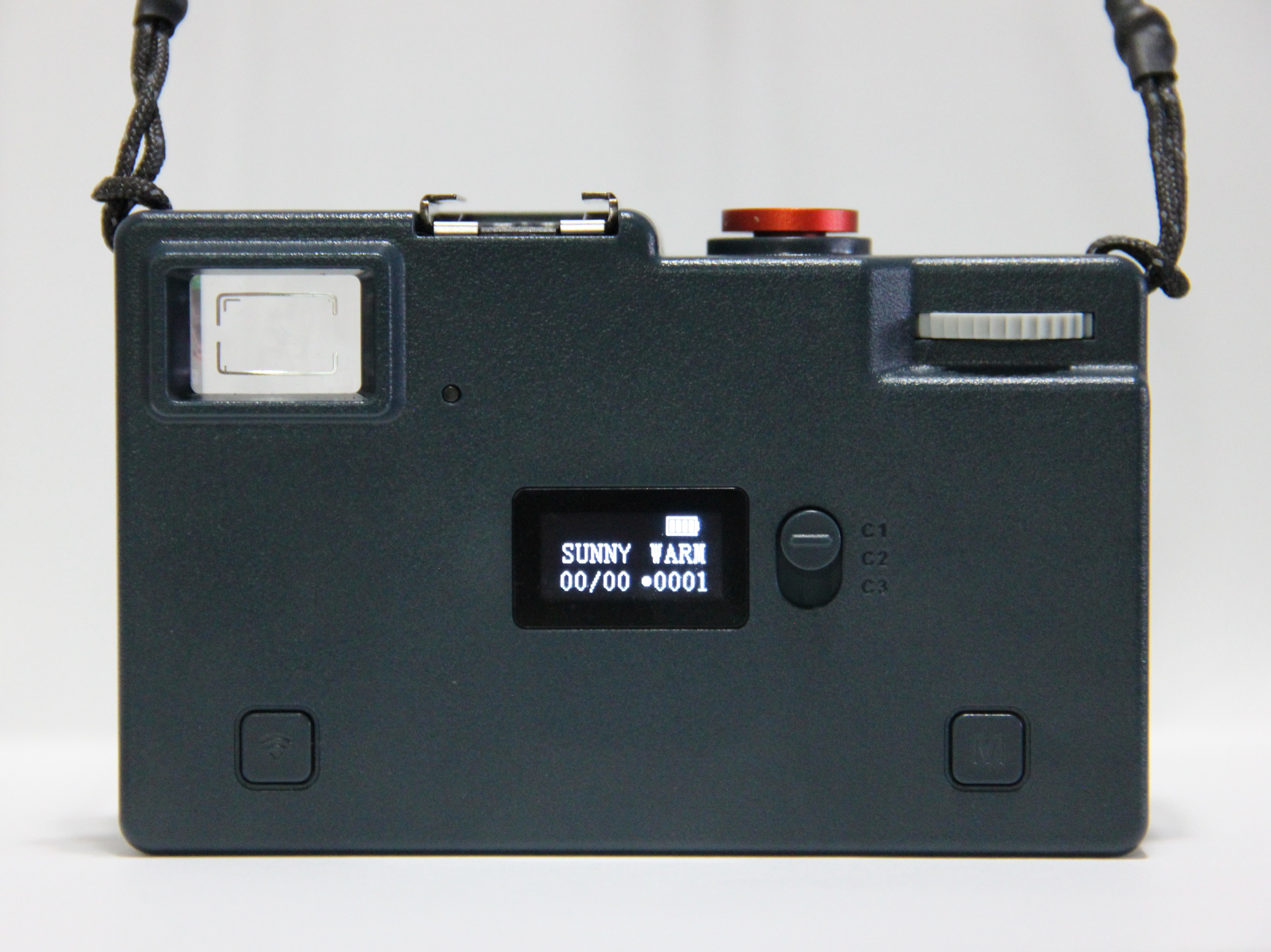
Rewindpix camera back

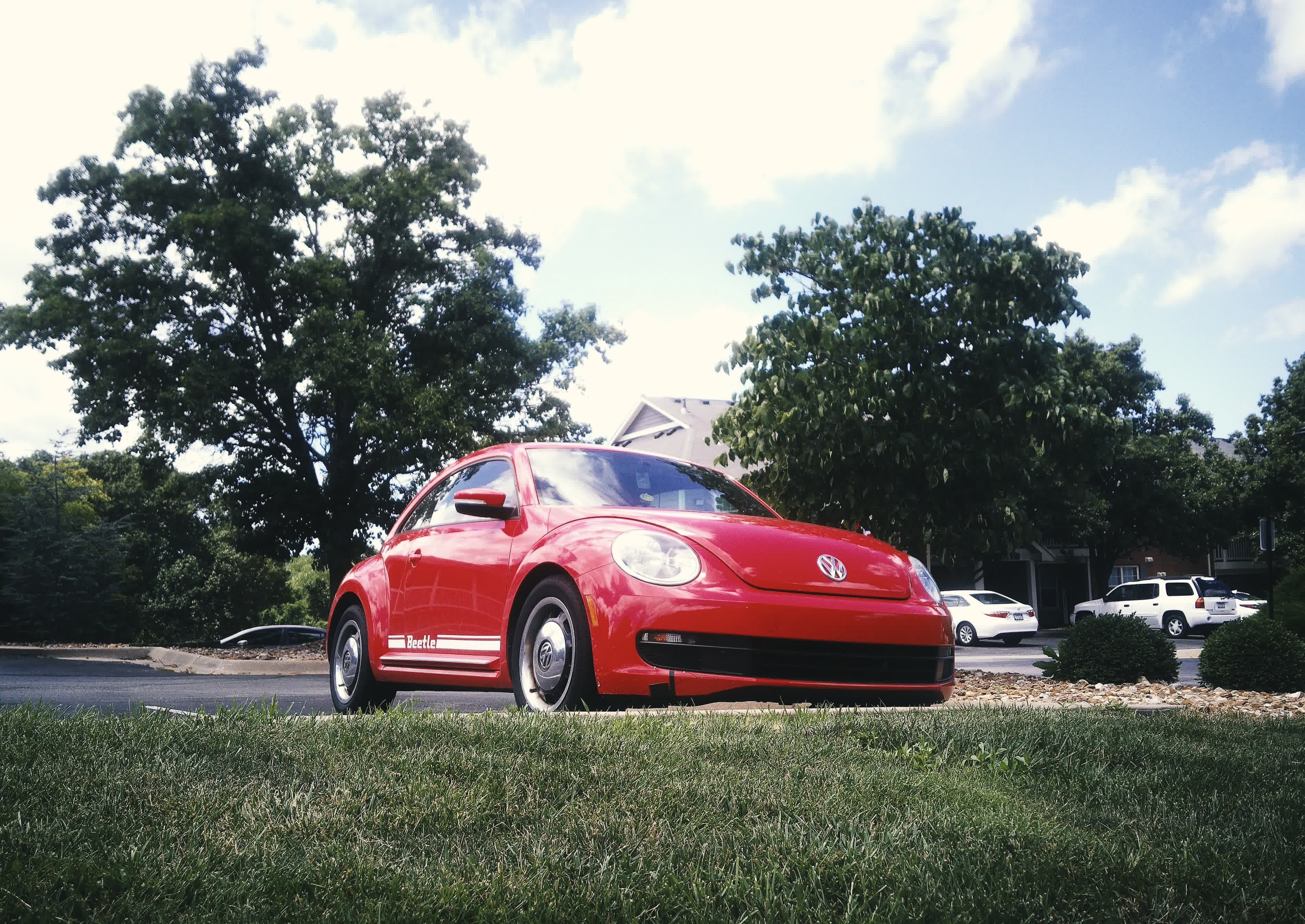
Red Volkswagen shot with GL200 filter (inspired by Kodak Gold 200)

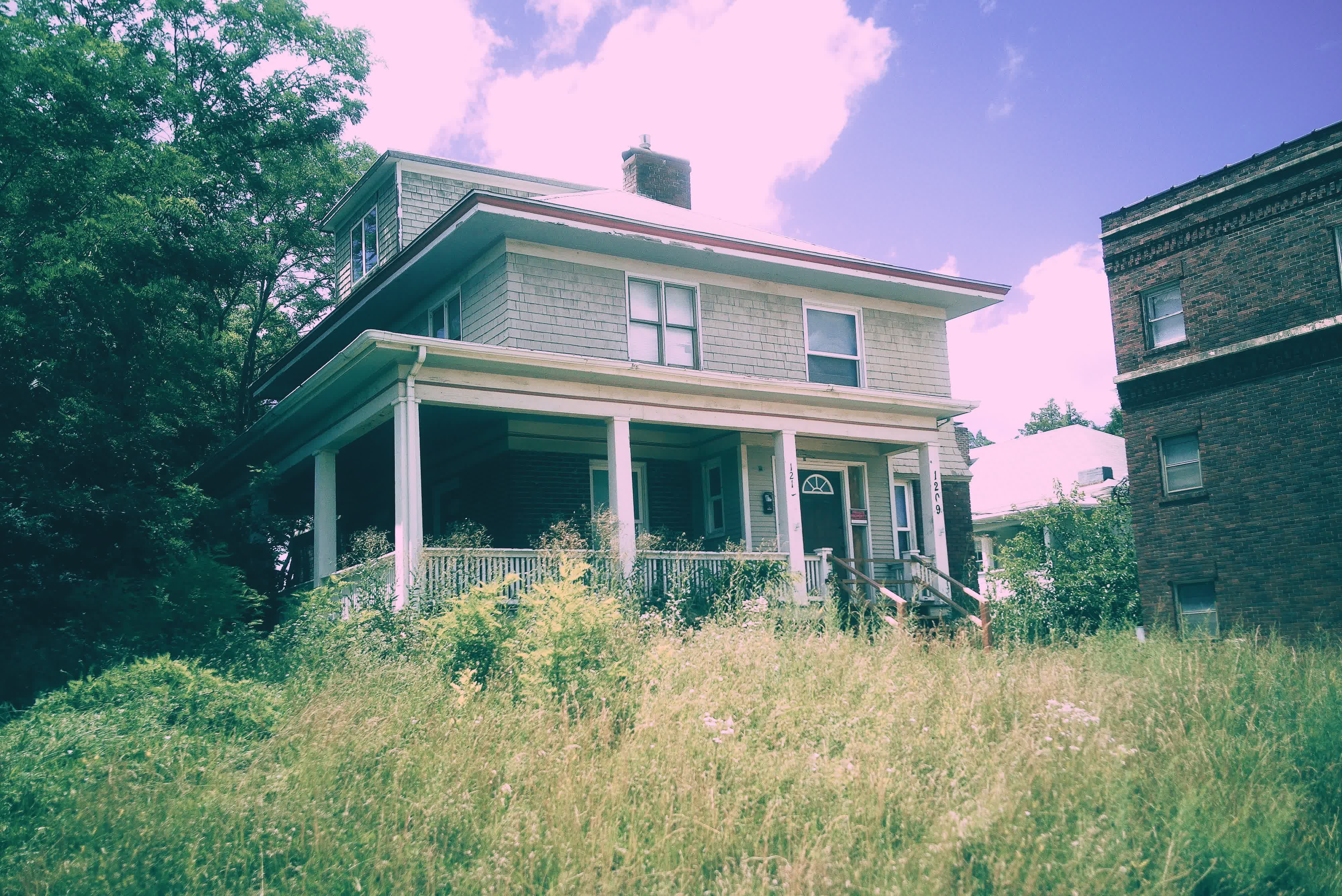
Abandoned house shot with FJ200 filter (inspired by Fujifilm C200)

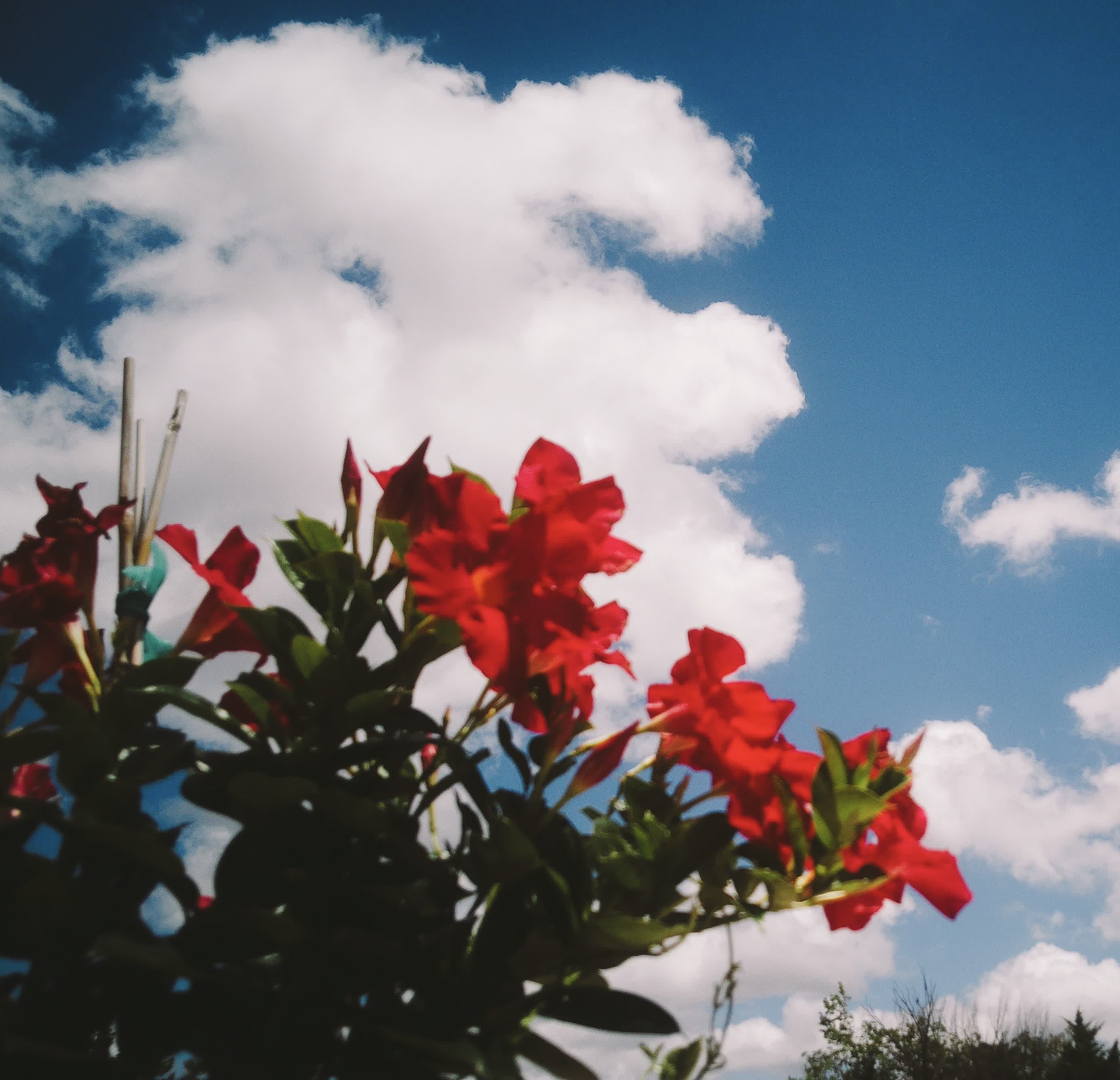
Flowers shot with PT400 filter (inspired by Kodak Portra 400)

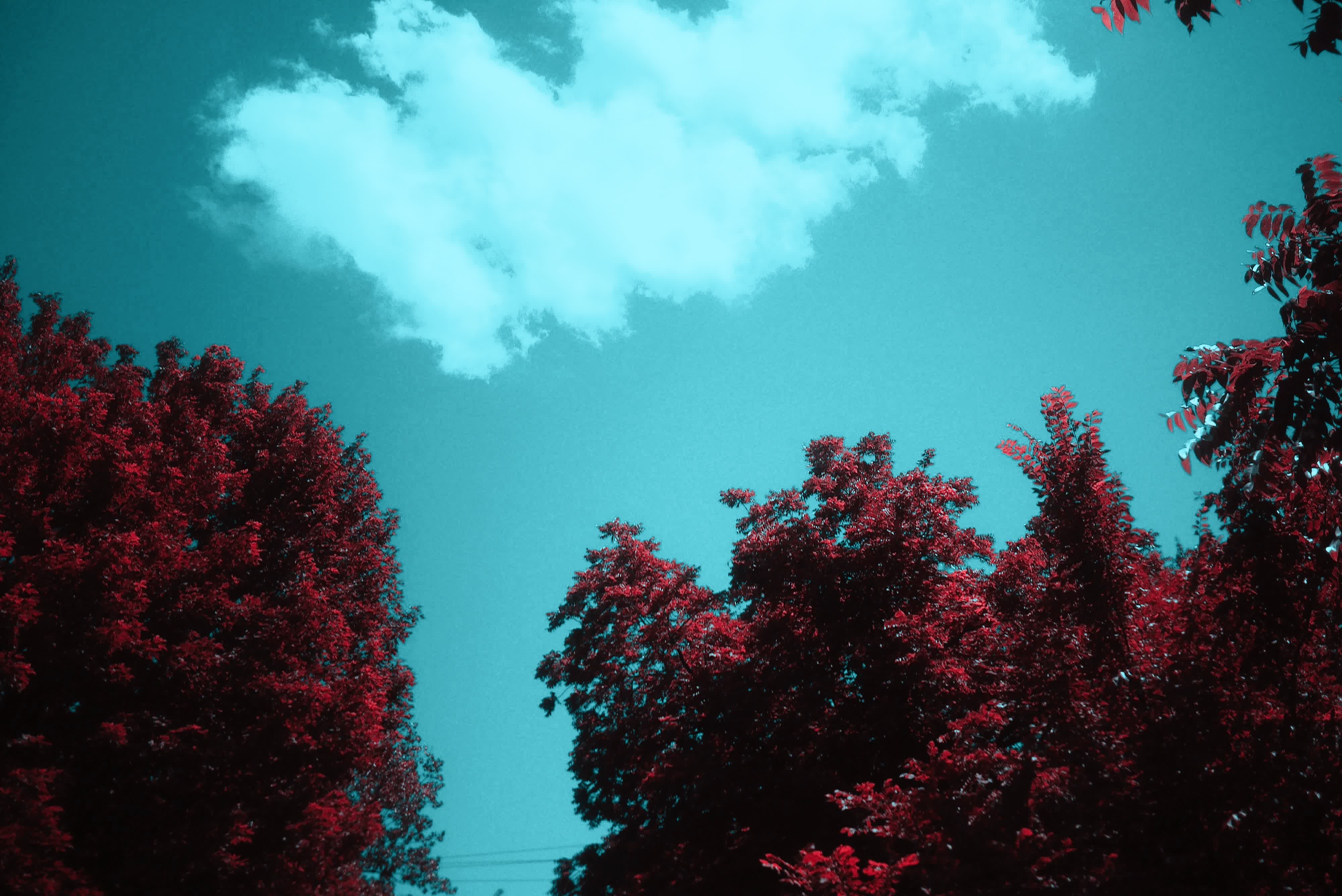
Tree leaves under infrared filter

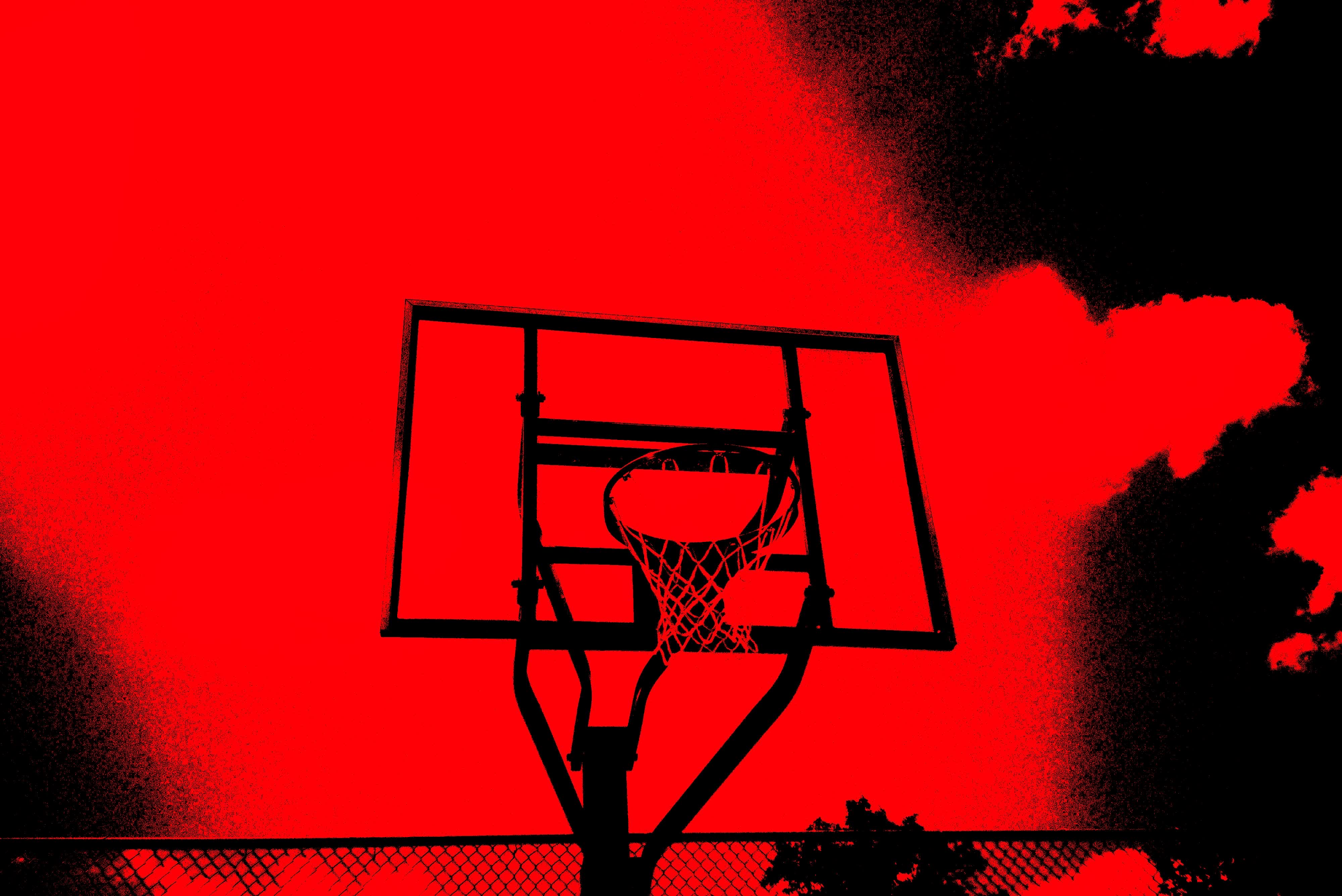
Photo of a basketball hoop using the Redsketch filter

== See also ==
- Digital detox
- Nostalgia consumption
- Retro
