= Lisa-Jo van den Scott =

Canadian sociologist

- Occupation: Sociology Professor

Academic background
- Education: Northwestern University Memorial University Mount Allison University

Academic work
- Discipline: Sociologist
- Sub-discipline: Symbolic Interaction Qualitative Methods Sociology of Time and Place
- Institutions: Memorial University of Newfoundland

Lisa-Jo van den Scott is a Canadian sociologist, currently a professor of sociology at Memorial University of Newfoundland. She is the editor-in-chief for the journal Symbolic Interaction. She serves as a member of advisory board for International Institute for Qualitative Methodology (IIQM). She is known for her focus on qualitative methods, symbolic interaction, sociology of space and time in international sociological societies which she won awards for, including Kathy Charmaz Early-in-Career Award, American Sociological Association Paper Award, and Brent K. Marshall Student Paper Award.
