= The Dawn's Early Light =

Non-fiction book about the Battle of Baltimore

- First edition dustcover (1972)
- Author: Walter Lord
- Language: English
- Published: 1972
- Publisher: W. W. Norton, 1972; Johns Hopkins University Press, 1994 and 2012
- Publication place: United States
- Media type: Print
- Pages: 384
- ISBN: 0-393-05452-7

The Dawn's Early Light is a 1972 non-fiction book by Walter Lord about the War of 1812 Battle of Baltimore and the events leading up to it. Lord said he wrote the book because of the event's significance in American history. It is one of his 13 bestsellers.

Lord recounts the conflict between Great Britain and the United States in the summer of 1814, when the British mounted a coordinated attack on Baltimore, Maryland, and its environs by land and sea. Having already suffered a humiliating defeat at the Battle of Bladensburg and the resulting burning of Washington by the British, the American forces were able to repulse the British advance on Baltimore. The climax of the battle was the Royal Navy's bombardment of Baltimore's Fort McHenry on the night of September 14, 1814. The American stalwart defense of the fort would prove decisive, forcing the British to withdraw. The battle inspired the writing of the "Star-Spangled Banner" by Francis Scott Key.

== Publication history ==
The Dawn's Early Light is one of Lord's 13 bestsellers, along with A Night to Remember, Day of Infamy, and Incredible Victory. Initially published by W. W. Norton in 1972, it includes 16 pages of illustrations and several maps, such as the British advance on Washington and the movement of British forces by land and sea during the subsequent attack on Baltimore. The dust cover has a reproduction of Alfred Jacob Miller's painting, The Bombardment of Fort McHenry (ca. 1828–1830), from the collection of the Maryland Historical Society. The book had a second printing by Johns Hopkins University Press in 1994 and a third printing in 2012 for the bicentennial of the War of 1812.

== Narrative ==
In the foreword, Lord writes of the event's significance in the nation's history as his reason for writing the book: "... the summer of 1814 found America threatened by national extinction, her people torn by dissension, her treasury empty, her economy in ruins, her coasts blockaded and defenseless ... Yet within eight months all had changed. America was again at peace, her people unified, her economy mending ... her position safe in the family of nations". He begins by examining British attitudes toward its erstwhile colony. Having just vanquished Napoleon, Britain was not disposed to suffer what it viewed as impertinence by the uncouth Americans. He quotes the London newspapers' contemptuous dismissal of U.S. President James Madison as "an ambitious madman", "liar", and "serpent". On the American side, he characterizes the complacency and dissension by the Federal government even as the looming presence of the British fleet in the Chesapeake Bay threatened the young nation's capital.

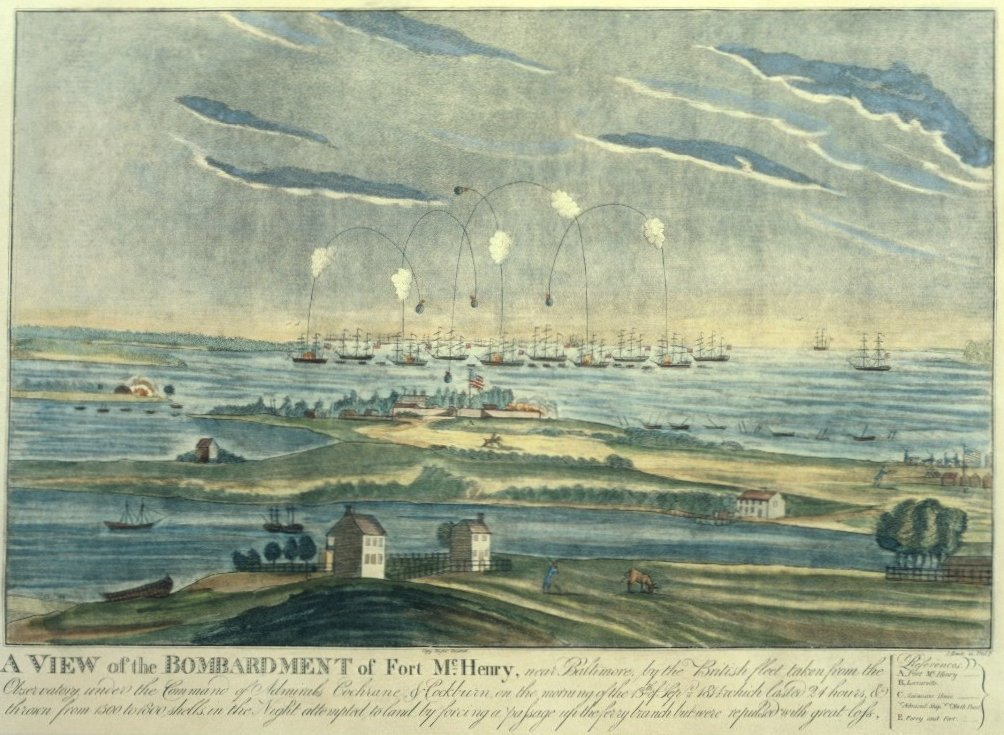
A contemporary drawing of the bombardment of Fort McHenry, one of the illustrations reproduced in The Dawn's Early Light

The book's narrative of the dramatic battlefield death of Maj. Gen. Robert Ross while leading the invaders at the Battle of North Point, and the effect on his soldiers in seeing their mortally wounded commander prostrate on the ground, has been cited by others writing about the battle and the significance of his loss to the British campaign. Earlier that day, Ross had boasted he would seize Baltimore by nightfall, saying, "I'll eat in Baltimore tonight — or in hell".

Time magazine cited the book's vivid account of the violent nighttime arrest of William Beanes, the hostage for whom Francis Scott Key was sent by President Madison to negotiate with his British captors: “a party of British horsemen rode up to Beanes’ front door, crashed into the house, and pulled the doctor out of bed". The Baltimore Sun cited Lord's book research in an article discussing the debate by historians about the flag Key saw waving over Fort McHenry's ramparts, or whether a flag could even be seen from his distance.

== Critical commentaries ==
The Los Angeles Times called it "the definitive book about the burning of Washington during the War of 1812". In selecting the book for re-printing, the Johns Hopkins university press said, "Lord wrote with great force and feeling of the subsequent defense of Fort McHenry, the circumstances of Francis Scott Key's writing of 'The Star-Spangled Banner,' and the rebirth of a young country. Students consider this book to be one of the best short narratives of the Chesapeake campaign."

Another reviewer summarized the book by saying, "Lord gives readers a dramatic account of how a new sense of national identity emerged from the smoky haze of what Francis Scott Key so lyrically called 'the dawn's early light.'"
