= Nostalgia consumption =

Consumption of goods eliciting memories

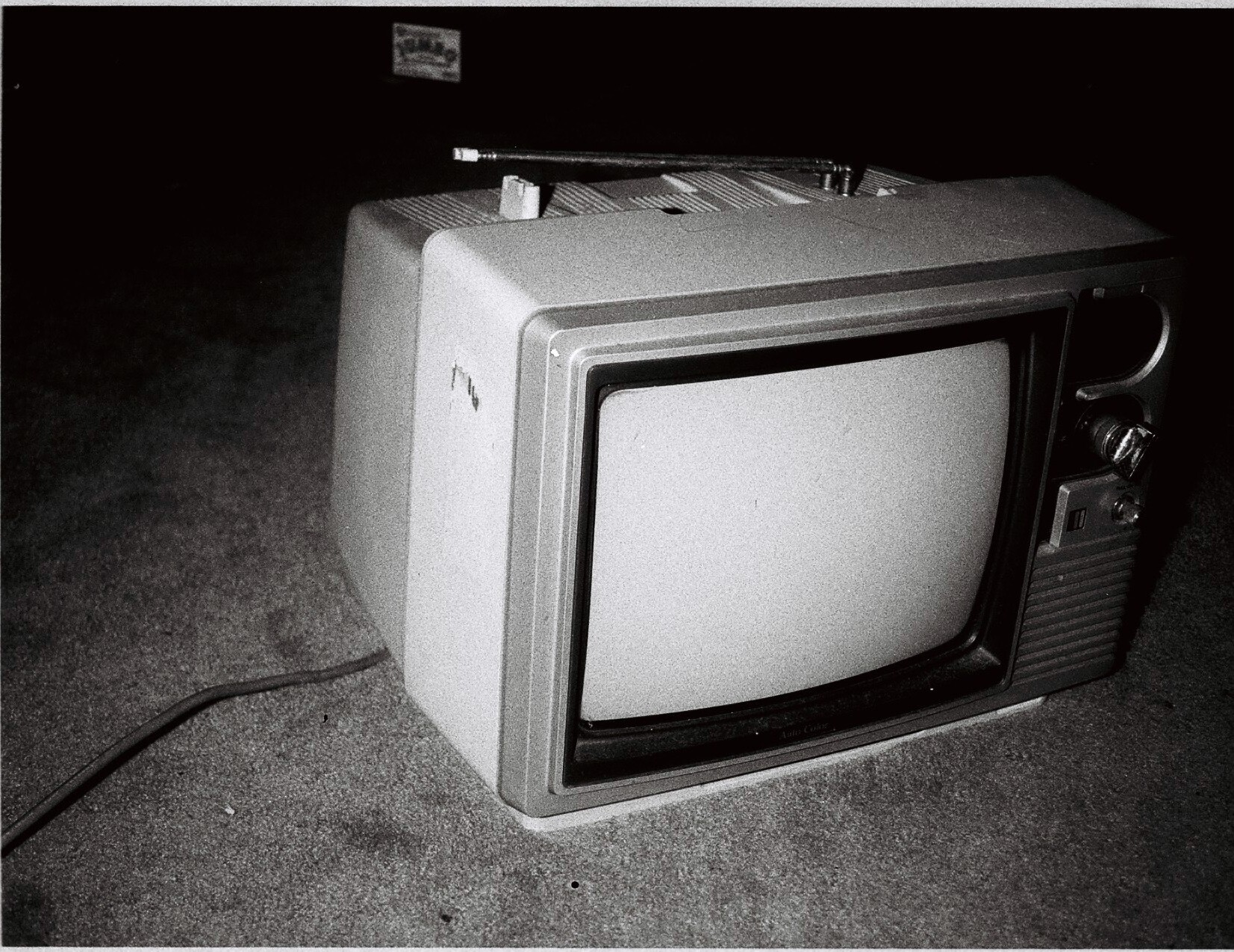
An example of a vintage television

Nostalgia consumption is a social and cultural trend that could be described as the act of consuming goods that elicit memories from the past, being associated with the feeling of nostalgia.

== History and theory ==
It could be said that, through their everyday consumption, goods acquire new meanings in relation to the way consumers use and perceive them. Indeed, consumers engage themselves in a new kind of activity, transforming goods into personal objects through an active work of symbolisation. As reported by Sassatelli in the book Consumer Culture, "the value of things depends on the value they are given by the subject, rather than being founded on absolutes".

=== Origins ===
The origins of consumed nostalgia date back to the second half of the twentieth century. As explained in the article Media, Memory and Nostalgia in Contemporary France: Between Commemoration, Memorialisation, Reflection and Restoration, one of the first important sociologists who studied nostalgia, Fred Davis (1979), divided the nostalgic experience into three different levels: simple, reflexive and interpreted. The first one is based on the belief that "things were better in the past". At the second level, the individual starts raising questions concerning the truth of the nostalgic claim, then entering in the third one by going beyond the issues of historical accuracy into a deeper analysis.

As far as the consuming dimension is concerned, it might be said that the first level proposed by Davis helps us in understanding how consumed nostalgia has always achieved excellent results in various markets from the 1900s: generations usually experience this feeling for an epoch before its own of about twenty years. Nowadays, the most iconic nostalgia is the one that comes from the early 2000s. Anyway, this nostalgia could turn into a utopian vision of the past since "an individual's idealized perception of it automatically erases any negative traces".

=== Patina ===
From a sociological point of view, the anthropologist Grant McCracken (1988) talks about the patina of time as the value that objects gain with the flow of time: it is strictly related to the family, as the action of passing down an object through different generations, and it poses its emphasis on the past. It is somehow opposed to the definition of fashion given by Georg Simmel, focused on an individualistic emphasis of the present and its newness. This dualistic vision is still present in contemporary societies, even if today these two elements seem to coexist: patina has been recuperated in simulated forms, created through mass-production, such as artificially aged items. This new dimension of consumption is enriched by a "modern hedonism", described by Campbell as a private state of the mind through which goods become the results of human creativity and fantasy.

=== Nostalgia and consumption: reluctant, progressive, playful ===
According to the Hartmann and Brunk's article Nostalgia marketing and (re-)enchantment, it might be stated that we are nowadays dealing with a re-establishment of enchantment, a way to escape from ordinary and rationalized life in order to recuperate the hedonism of life. This "(re-)enchantment", at the base of the previously described modern hedonism, is described as the "recovery of utopian, romantic, mythical, emotional, and imaginary elements of the relationship consumers have with the world". According to Badot and Filser, who are cited in the same article, markets absolve an important role in this process, allowing to incorporate non-functional sources of value in goods and services and turning them into sources of hedonic, symbolic, and interpersonal value. As a result of their experiment, the researchers found out that a past-themed consumption can create (re-)enchantment by eliciting different kinds of nostalgia, as explained in the following lines.

- Re-instantiation enables consumers to symbolically project themselves back into a past cultural condition and re-instantiate it in the here and now. It is rooted in reluctant nostalgia, through which an experience of temporal belonging is created by symbolically traveling back to a better and happier – but now lost – time and space.
- Re-enactment is a symbolic return to morally valuable aspects of a past, in which past-themed brands are considered by consumers as tokens of a cultural condition that now appears to be superior in some ways. This is elicited by progressive nostalgia, created by bringing the past and present into dialogue: the utopian version of a society better than the current one.
- Re-appropriation, through playful nostalgia – ironic and ludic dimensions of nostalgia as cultural style and retro markers of taste – opens engagement with the past to those who have no lived experiences of it, a filtered and sanitized past life world. Consumers valorise past-themed brands purely as ironic, vintage, and quirky fashion items that enliven the present.

== Iconic cases ==
Nostalgic signals may be found in many areas of consumption as well as in advertising. The choice to use nostalgic cues could be justified by the fact that nostalgic symbols provoke nostalgic memories, which in turn induce emotions in consumers. In media and advertising, nostalgia-evoking references are used strategically to create a sense of association between the products and the consumers, in order to convince the public to consume. As the early 1990s wave of nostalgia-related marketing adopted references from the 1960s to captivate the young adults of that time, in the same way, the corresponding marketing strategies work nowadays referring to the background of today's consumers. A lot of products and packages related to the past have been reintroduced in several market sectors. The following lines will treat meaningful examples of the use of nostalgia in different consumption areas.

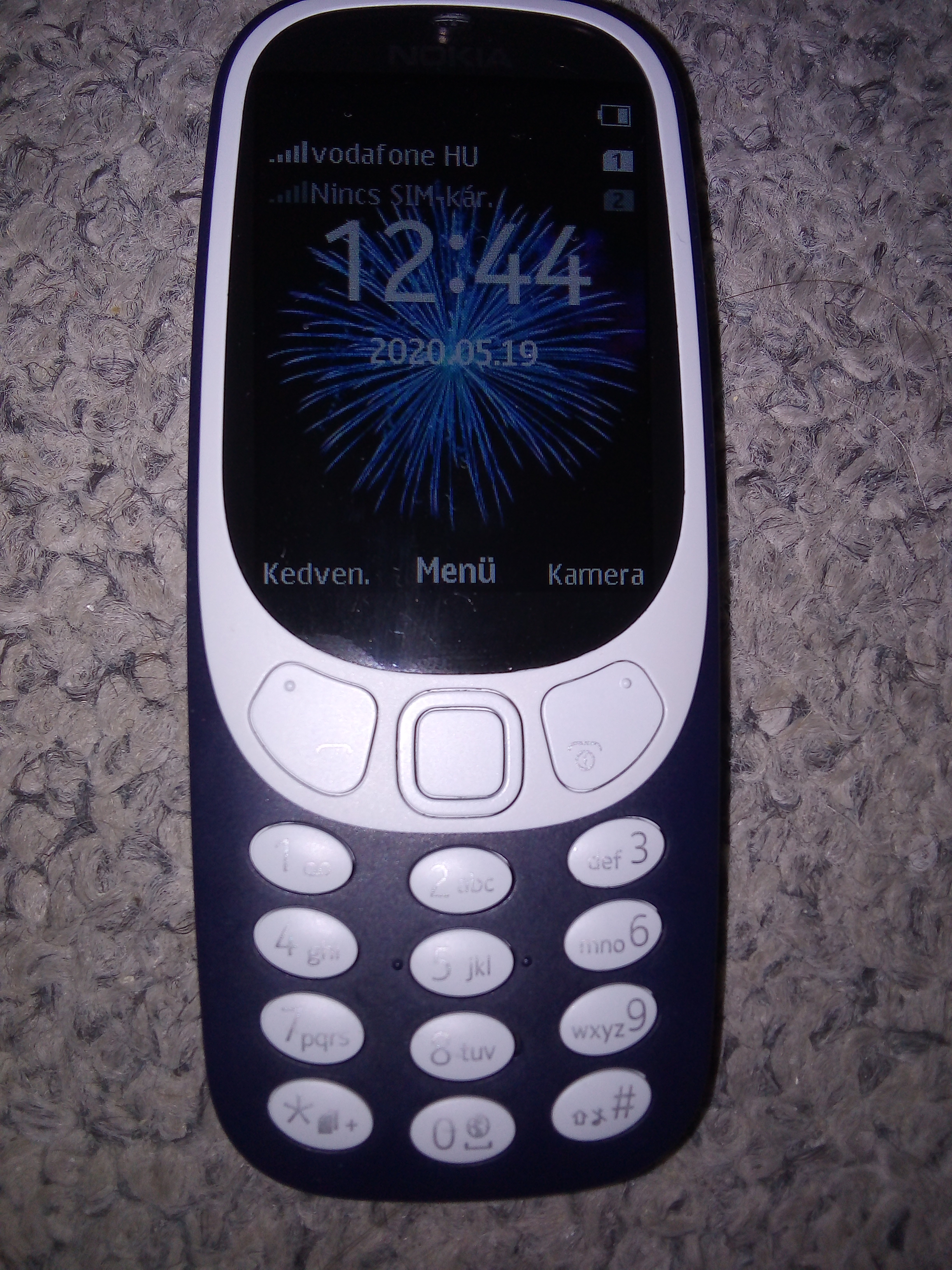
Nokia 3310

=== Technology ===
Nostalgia consumption plays a meaningful role in the technology industry as many goods went through a resurgence thanks to this phenomenon. Objects like Nokia 3310 enjoyed a revival due, in large part, to social media. In 2017 Nokia relaunched a new version of the cell phone to exploit the second-hand success.

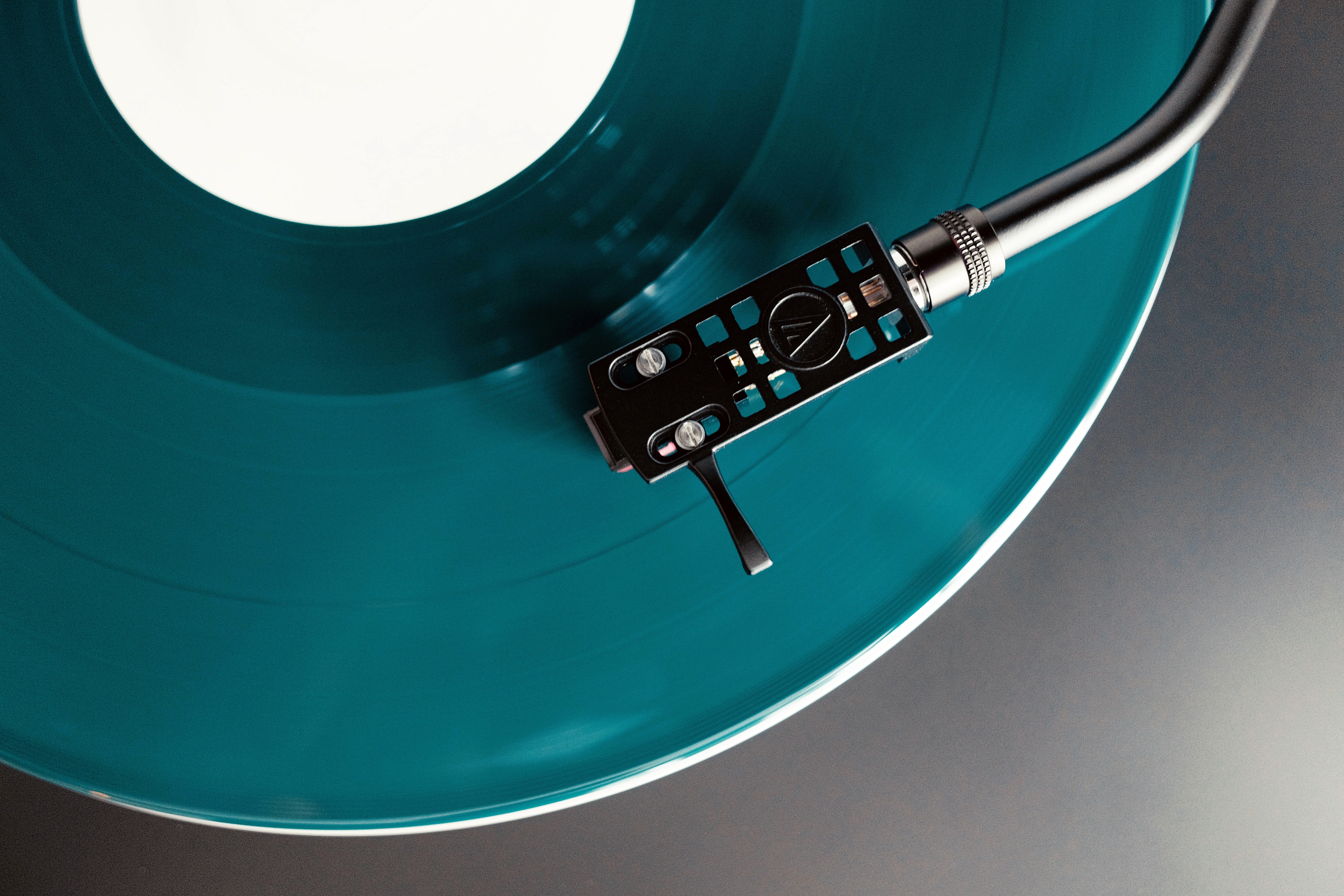
A modern vintage-designed record-player

Furthermore, while record players initially fell out of fashion in favour of CDs and digital music, they have recently become more popular, possibly due to their vintage design and the tactile experience of listening to music on one, which is very different to listening to digital music.

=== Social media ===
In its early years, Instagram had many similarities with Polaroid snapshots. The possibility to post only square photographs and the design of the trademark were the most distinct parallels that may have elicited nostalgia in early users. More recently both Facebook and Instagram introduced the Memories function which allows users to recall moments of their lives through old posts.

=== Video games ===
Generation Z is well-known for nostalgic consumption on video games and video game consoles, mainly consisting of products from the Japanese video game company Nintendo. The company has previously utilized nostalgic marketing strategies for various ventures, including the Nintendo Museum.

== In younger generations ==
In the 1970s, movies such as Grease and American Graffiti, along with TV shows such as Happy Days, started a trend in entertainment content production that was based on arousing nostalgia for the 1950s in consumers of the first half of the baby boom generation. However, younger audiences which were not alive during the period were also observed as feeling a mild sense of nostalgia for this era.

Starting in the 2000s onwards, younger generations have faced disruptions in education, job markets, cost of living, and quality of life, leading them to seek solace in earlier eras. People are increasingly seeking comfort and escape by looking back to the past, especially after the challenges of recent years. Gen Z (born between 1997 and 2006) is the most nostalgic generation, with 15% preferring to think about the past. Millennials (born between 1981 and 1996) closely follow, with 14% sharing this preference.

The Netflix science-fiction drama series Stranger Things is a popular example of television both using and evoking nostalgia for the 1980s. Researchers Tom van Laer and Davide Orazi described the effect of the series on the younger consumers who never experienced the 1980s, which were actually experienced by Generation X, as "pseudo-nostalgia". However, Charles Fairchild, associate professor of popular music at the University of Sydney, disputes that concept and label, saying:

You can have nostalgia for things you haven’t directly experienced. What Stranger Things has done is taken this era and put coherence and a story to it. It has taken this music, fashion and popular culture and given it a focus. There’s a shared experience that gives people a vivid and immediate connection, and that’s what the Kate Bush song [Running Up That Hill] has done.
