= A Night to Remember (book) =

1955 non-fiction book by Walter Lord

A Night to Remember (Titanic)
- 1955 American first edition cover
- Author: Walter Lord
- Language: English
- Subject: Sinking of the RMS Titanic
- Publisher: R & W Holt
- Publication date: November 1955
- Publication place: United States
- Media type: Print (Hardback & Paperback)
- Pages: 182
- ISBN: 0-03-027615-2 (hardback edition)
- OCLC: 1075502
- Followed by: The Night Lives On

A Night to Remember is a 1955 non-fiction book by Walter Lord that tells the story of the sinking of the RMS Titanic in 1912. The book was hugely successful, and is still considered a definitive resource about the Titanic. Lord interviewed 63 survivors of the disaster and drew on books, memoirs, and articles that they had written. In 1986, Lord authored his follow-up book, The Night Lives On, following renewed interest in the story after the wreck of the Titanic was discovered by Robert Ballard.

The book was notably adapted as a British film, with advice from Lord, that was released in 1958.

== Publication history ==
Lord traveled on the RMS Olympic, Titanic's sister ship, when he was a boy, 13 years after Titanic sank, and the experience gave him a lifelong fascination with the lost liner. As he later put it, he spent his time on the Olympic "prowling around" and trying to imagine "such a huge thing" sinking. He started reading about and drawing Titanic at the age of ten and spent many years collecting Titanic memorabilia, causing people to "take note of this oddity." He majored in history at Princeton University and graduated from Yale Law School before joining the New York–based advertising agency J. Walter Thompson. Writing in his spare time, he interviewed 63 survivors of the disaster.

A Night to Remember was only Lord's second book but was a huge success, thanks in no small part to the aggressive advertising campaign carried out by R & W Holt following its launch in November 1955. The book also undoubtedly benefited from the popularity of the 1953 film Titanic and other coverage of the disaster that was published around the same time. Within two months of its publication, the book had sold 60,000 copies and remained listed as a best-seller for six months. The Ladies' Home Journal and Reader's Digest both published condensed versions and it was selected in June 1956 by the Book of the Month Club. The first paperback edition was published by Bantam Books in October 1956.

Since then the book has never been out of print and has been translated into over a dozen languages. Its success enabled Lord to leave the world of advertising and become a full-time writer. After the discovery of the wreck of the Titanic in 1985 sparked a new wave of public interest in the disaster he wrote a follow-up book, The Night Lives On (1986). Daniel Allen Butler comments that "although it was of immense interest to Titanic buffs the world over, it lacked the spark of the original," which by 1998 had reached its fiftieth printing.

== Critical commentaries ==
The book received widespread praise from contemporary critics. The New York Times called it "stunning ... one of the most exciting books of this or any other year". The Atlantic Monthly praised the book for doing "a magnificent job of re-creative chronicling, enthralling from the first word to the last." Entertainment Weekly said that it was "seamless and skillful... it's clear why this is many a researcher's Titanic bible", while USA Today described it as "the most riveting narrative of the disaster."

The secret to Lord's success, according to the New York Herald Tribune's critic Stanley Walker, was that he used "a kind of literary pointillism, the arrangement of contrasting bits of fact and emotion in such a fashion that a vividly real impression of an event is conveyed to the reader." Walker highlighted the way that Lord had avoided telling the story through the prism of social class, which had been the usual style of previous narratives, and instead successfully depicted the human element of the story by showing how those aboard reacted to the disaster whatever their class.

Steven Biel, an American cultural historian, notes the novelistic way in which Lord tells the story. The book depicts events through the eyes of multiple individuals, violating simple chronology to present an overlapping series of narratives. Nathaniel Philbrick, writing in the introduction to the fiftieth anniversary edition of A Night to Remember, notes that at the time of publication it was the first significant book about Titanic for nearly forty years. He argues that the book's hallmarks are its restraint, brevity and readability, which downplay the extravagant and mythical aspects of the disaster and instead put in the foreground the stories of the people on the ship. The narrative builds suspense, making the reader care about the characters and revisit the disaster from their perspective. It tells the story in a highly visual and aural way, describing the sights and sounds of the night of the disaster "with the immediacy of a live broadcast or a television documentary", as Biel puts it.

A key to Lord's method is his technique of adopting an unconventional approach to the chronology of the event, "[taking] an imaginative approach to time and space in which hours and minutes prove extremely malleable, the ship itself seems almost infinitely complex, and the disaster assumes order and unity from far away." In short it is "a modernist narrative [constructed] around a modernist event." Reviewers highlighted the way in which Lord depicted the human side of the Titanic story, which The New York Times called "the core of Mr. Lord's account, and explains its fascination, a pull as powerful in its way as the last downward plunge of the ship itself." While the "legendary acts of gallantry" stood out, the book invites readers to put themselves in the place of those aboard and implicitly asks how they would react in the same situation. As Newsweek put it, "What would it be like to be aboard a sinking ocean liner?"

The significance of Lord's book, according to Biel, is that it "gave the disaster its fullest retelling since 1912 and made it speak to a modern mass audience and a new set of postwar concerns. In the creation of the Titanic myth there were two defining moments: 1912, of course, and 1955." Lord updates the popular interpretation of the Titanic disaster by portraying it in world-historical terms as the symbolic and actual end of an era, and as an event which "marked the end of a general feeling of confidence." Uncertainty replaced orderliness, and the ship's sinking marked the beginning of the twentieth century's "unending sequence of disillusionment. Before the Titanic, all was quiet. Afterward, all was tumult." Biel notes that Lord's underlying theme is a rather nostalgic reflection of the "nobler instincts" exhibited in the disaster and their subsequent eclipse. Such ideals were attractive for a post-war society that celebrated the role of the nuclear family and the traditional roles of the male breadwinner and female homemaker.

Lord's invocation of an era of confidence and certainty was also a relevant theme at the height of the Cold War. The University of California sociologist Fred Davis comments that nostalgia "thrives ... on the rude transitions wrought by such phenomena as war, depression, civil disturbance, and cataclysmic natural disasters – in short, those events that cause masses of people to feel uneasy and to wonder whether the world and their being are quite what they always took them to be." The turmoil and uncertainty of the early Atomic Age and the onset of profound social changes made the old concepts of the nuclear family and traditional gender roles, reflected in the behaviour of Titanic's passengers, resonate with a mid-1950s audience.

The gradual nature of the disaster was also more comforting, in some respects, compared with the nature of modern technological failures such as air crashes. Time's reviewer made this point explicitly: "This air age, when death comes too swiftly for heroism or with no survivors to record it, can still turn with wonder to an age before yesterday when a thousand deaths at sea seemed the very worst the world must suffer." It was, as Steven Biel comments, "a quainter kind of disaster" in which the victims had time to prepare and chose how to die.

== Audio adaptations ==
In 2012, AudioGo published an unabridged audiobook edition of the book, read by Martin Jarvis. As of 2015, this audiobook is available on Audible.

== Screen adaptations ==
The book has been adapted twice for the screen. The first production, A Night to Remember (1956), was staged as a live adaptation screened on 28 March 1956 by NBC TV and sponsored by Kraft Foods as part of the Kraft Television Theatre program. It has been described as "the biggest, most lavish, most expensive thing of its kind" attempted up to that point, with 31 sets, 107 actors, 72 speaking parts, 3,000 gallons of water and costing $95,000 ($1,125,000 at present-day prices). George Roy Hill directed and Claude Rains provided a narration – a practice borrowed from radio dramas which provided a template for many television dramas of the time. It took a similar approach to the book, lacking dominant characters and switching between a multiplicity of scenes. Rains' narration was used "to bridge the almost limitless number of sequences of life aboard the doomed liner", as a reviewer put it, and closed with his declaration that "never again has Man been so confident. An age had come to an end." The production was a major hit, attracting 28 million viewers, and greatly boosted the book's sales. It was rerun on kinescope on 2 May 1956, five weeks after its first broadcast.

The second adaptation was the 1958 British drama film A Night to Remember starring Kenneth More, which is still widely regarded as "the definitive cinematic telling of the story." The film came about after its eventual director, Roy Ward Baker, and its producer, Belfast-born William MacQuitty both acquired copies of the book – Baker from his favorite bookshop and MacQuitty from his wife – and decided to obtain the film rights. MacQuitty had actually seen Titanic being launched on 31 May 1911 and still remembered the occasion vividly. He met Lord and brought him on board the production as a consultant. The film diverges from both the book and the NBC TV adaptation in focusing on a central character, Second Officer Charles Lightoller, played by More. Its conclusion reflects Lord's world-historical theme of a "world changed for ever" with a fictional conversation between Lightoller and Colonel Archibald Gracie, sitting on a lifeboat. Lightoller declares that the disaster is "different ... Because we were so sure. Because even though it's happened, it's still unbelievable. I don't think I'll ever feel sure again. About anything."

== Collection ==
Lord later served as a consultant to film director James Cameron for his 1997 film Titanic. After Lord died in 2002, he bequeathed to the National Maritime Museum in Greenwich, England his huge collection of manuscripts, original letters and Titanic memorabilia, which he had gathered during his life and used to write A Night to Remember. MacQuitty also donated items from his own collection of material related to the film. Items from the collection are on display at the museum and can be accessed by researchers.

== Bibliography ==
- Anderson, D. Brian (2005). The Titanic in Print and on Screen. Jefferson, NC: McFarland & Company. ISBN 0-7864-1786-2.
- Biel, Steven (1996). Down with the Old Canoe. London: W.W. Norton & Company. ISBN 0-393-03965-X.
- Butler, Daniel Allen (1998). Unsinkable: The Full Story of the RMS Titanic. Mechanicsburg, PA: Stackpole Books. ISBN 978-0-8117-1814-1. "Butler, Daniel (1998). Unsinkable: the full story of the RMS Titanic."
- Davis, Fred (1979). Yearning for Yesterday: A Sociology of Nostalgia. New York: Free Press.
- Heyer, Paul (2012). Titanic Century: Media, Myth, and the Making of a Cultural Icon. Santa Barbara, CA: ABC-CLIO. ISBN 978-0-313-39815-5.
- Mayer, Geoff (2004). Roy Ward Baker. Manchester University Press. ISBN 978-0-7190-6354-1.
- Rasor, Eugene L. (2001). The Titanic: Historiography and Annotated Bibliography. Westport, CT: Greenwood Publishing Group. ISBN 978-0-313-31215-1.
- Welshman, John (2012). Titanic: The Last Night of a Small Town. Oxford: Oxford University Press. ISBN 978-0-19-161173-5.
- "National Maritime Museum receives historic Titanic archive: the Lord-Macquitty Collection". National Maritime Museum. 7 April 2003. Archived from the original on 14 April 2012.
