= Walter Lord =

American historian and author (1917–2002)

- Lord in 1958
- Born: October 8, 1917; Baltimore, Maryland, U.S.
- Died: May 19, 2002 (aged 84); New York City, U.S.
- Resting place: Green Mount Cemetery, Baltimore, Maryland
- Education: Princeton University (AB); Yale University (LLB)
- Occupations: Lawyer; Copywriter; Historian; Author
- Writing career
- Period: 1952–1986
- Genre: Narrative history
- Notable works: A Night to Remember; The Dawn's Early Light
- Notable awards: Francis Parkman Prize for Special Achievement (1994)

John Walter Lord Jr. (October 8, 1917 – May 19, 2002) was an American author, lawyer, copywriter and popular historian known for his 1955 account of the sinking of the Titanic, A Night to Remember.

== Biography ==
=== Early life ===
Lord was born in Baltimore, Maryland to John Walter Lord Sr. and Henrietta MacTier (Hoffman) Lord on October 8, 1917. His father, who was a lawyer, died when Lord was three years old. Lord's grandfather, Richard Curzon Hoffman, was president of the Baltimore Steam Packet Company ("Old Bay Line") steamship firm in the 1890s.

In July 1925, at the age of 7, Lord traveled across the Atlantic Ocean with his mother and sister, from New York to Cherbourg and Southampton, on the RMS Olympic, the Titanic's sister ship. Like many other boys whose high school education was at the Gilman School in Baltimore, he spent his summers at the Hyde Bay Camp for Boys at Hyde Bay in Cooperstown, New York, where he was awarded the honorary title of "The Commodore". He later returned to reign over many annual camp events, such as the eight-inch regatta and closing barbecue and bonfire.

Lord then studied history at Princeton University and graduated in 1939. He next enrolled at Yale Law School, interrupting his studies to join the United States Army after the attack on Pearl Harbor. During World War II, he was assigned to the Office of Strategic Services as a code clerk in London, in 1942. He was in the agency's secretariat when the war ended in 1945. Afterwards, Lord returned to Yale, where he earned a degree in law.

When the movie The Third Man came out in 1949, the movie's musical soundtrack was "The Third Man Theme" – a zither strummed by Anton Karas. This recording became a hit, and in 1950 Lord wrote lyrics for it. "The Third Man Theme" with Lord's lyrics were recorded by a number of bands.

=== Career ===
Lord wrote, or edited and annotated 11 bestselling books on such diverse subjects as the attack on Pearl Harbor (Day of Infamy, 1957), the Battle of Midway (Incredible Victory, 1967), the Battle of the Alamo (A Time to Stand, 1961), the Battle of Baltimore (The Dawn's Early Light, 1972), Arctic exploration (Peary to the Pole, 1963), pre-World War I America (The Good Years: From 1900 to the First World War, 1960), Coastwatchers (Lonely Vigil, 1977), the Dunkirk evacuation (The Miracle of Dunkirk, 1982), and the civil rights struggle (The Past That Would Not Die, 1965).

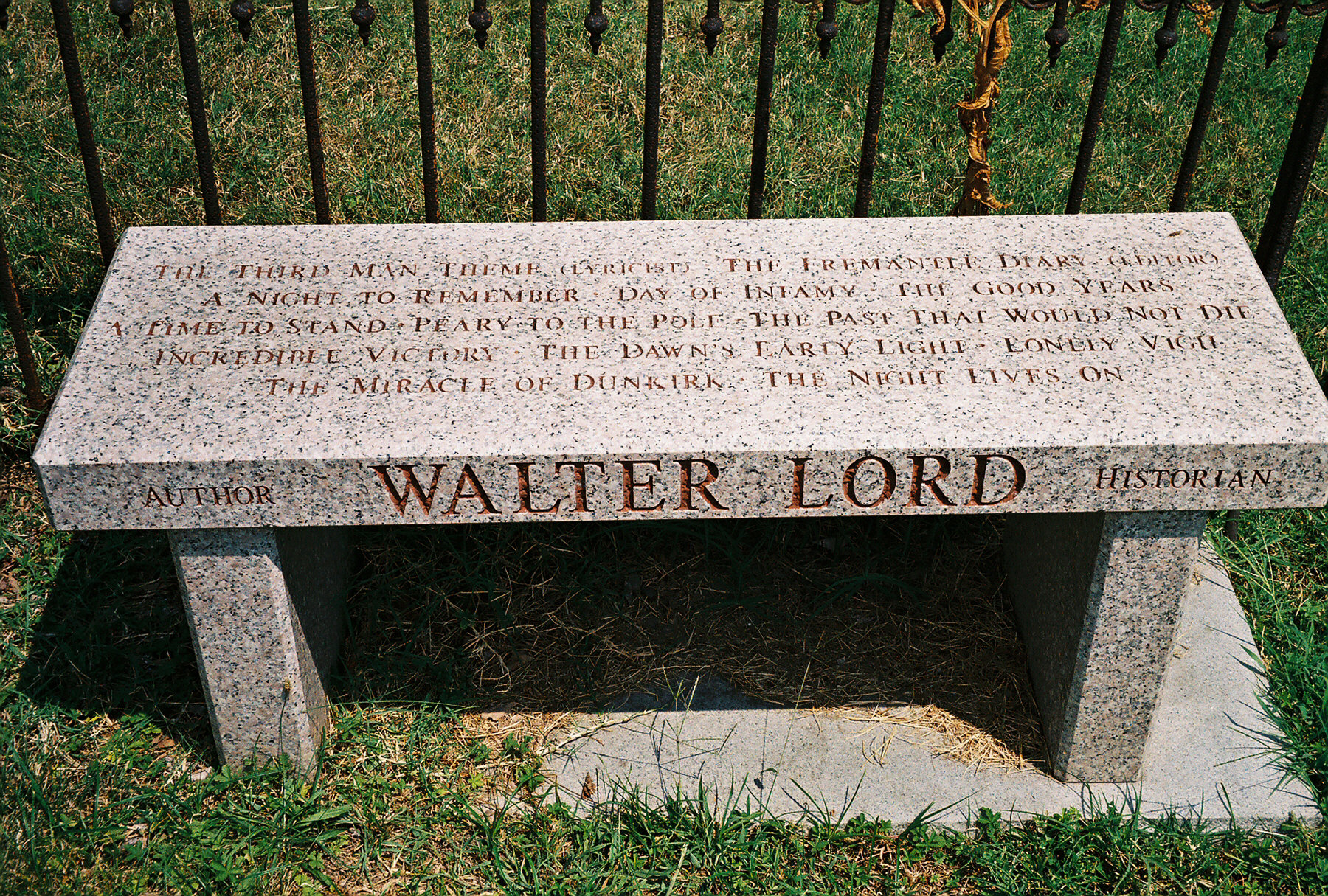
Memorial bench engraved with Lord's book titles

Shortly after going to work as a copywriter for the J. Walter Thompson advertising agency in New York City, Lord published The Fremantle Diary, edited and annotated from the journals of the British officer, Arthur Fremantle, who toured the South for three months in 1863. It became a mild, but surprising, success in 1954, as Lord was well into completing A Night to Remember, which would win him much popular acclaim.

A Night to Remember, about the sinking of the RMS Titanic, became a bestseller in 1955 and was made into a popular 1958 British movie of the same name. The historian tracked down 63 Titanic survivors and wrote a dramatic, minute-by-minute account of the ocean liner's sinking during her maiden voyage. Lord's knowledge of the Titanic catastrophe achieved considerable renown, and he frequently lectured at meetings of the Titanic Historical Society. In his final years, Lord wrote another book about the Titanic titled The Night Lives On: Thoughts, Theories and Revelations about the Titanic, published in 1986, a year after the wreck of the Titanic was discovered and interest in the Titanic renewed again. In the next decade, Lord served as a consultant to director James Cameron during the filming of Titanic (1997). The sequel documentary to Cameron's film Titanic, Ghosts of the Abyss (2003), was dedicated to Lord's memory.

In 1994, Lord was awarded the Francis Parkman Prize for Special Achievement for "scholarly and professional distinction."

In 2009, Jenny Lawrence edited and published a biography of Lord — The Way It Was: Walter Lord on His Life and Books. In the late 1980s, Lawrence had recorded hours of interviews she had with Lord, in which he discussed his writing and life. After chapters on his early life in Baltimore and up to his time with the OSS in London and Paris, chapters are devoted to his research and writing of each of his books.

=== Death ===
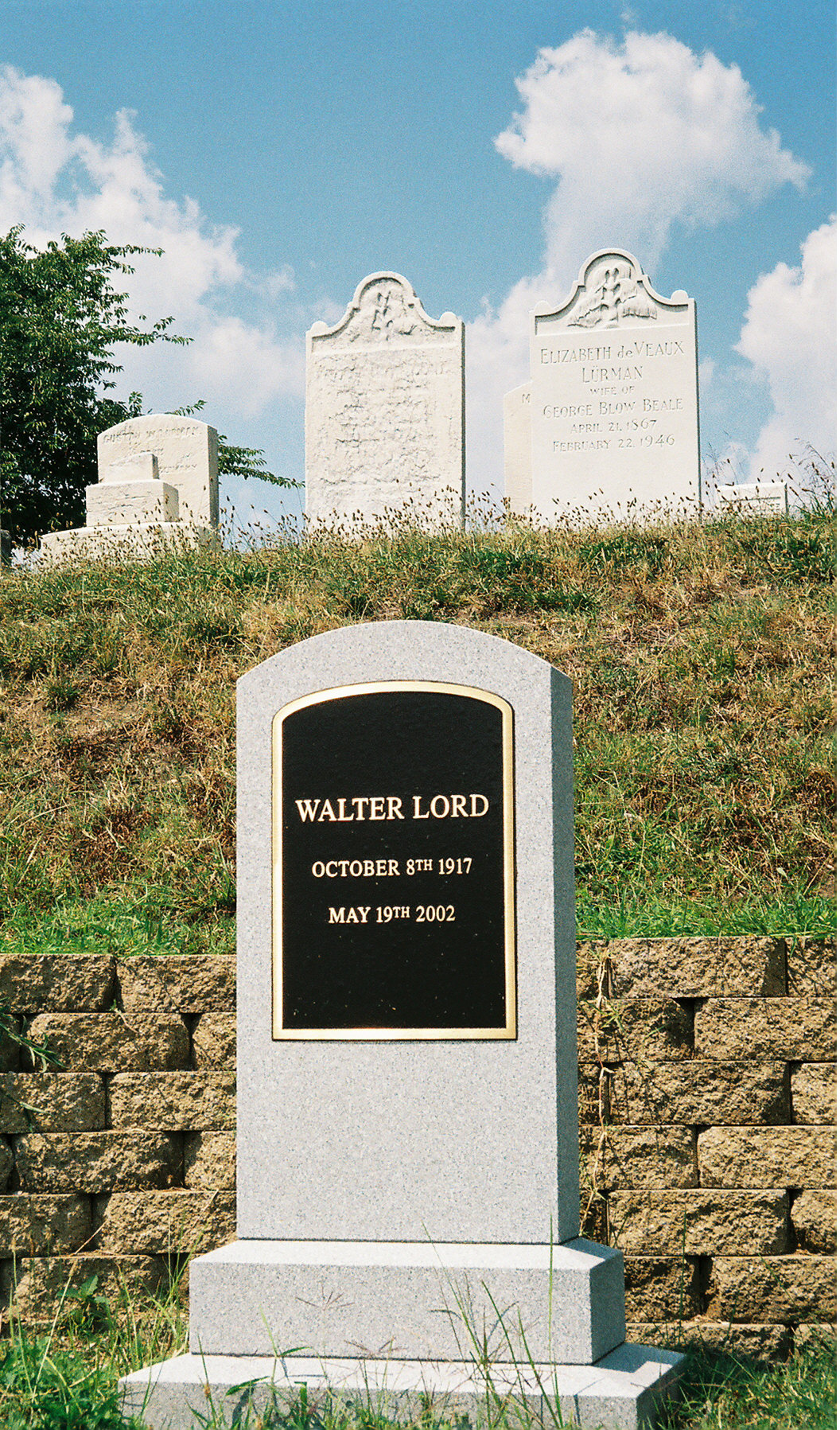
Lord's grave in the family plot at Green Mount Cemetery

Lord died at age 84 on May 19, 2002, after suffering from Parkinson's disease, at his Manhattan home. Noted historian David McCullough said of Lord at his death, "He was one of the most generous and kind-hearted men I've ever known, and when I had stars in my eyes and wanted to become a writer, he was a great help. I'll always be indebted to him."

Lord is buried in his maternal family's plot at historic Green Mount Cemetery in Baltimore. Near his grave stands a marble bench which lists the books he wrote.

== Publications ==
Lord published 12 historical works:

- The Fremantle Diary (1954) (ed.)
- A Night to Remember (1955)
- Day of Infamy: The Bombing of Pearl Harbor (1957)
- The Good Years: From 1900 to the First World War (1960)
- A Time to Stand: The Epic of the Alamo (1961)
- Peary to the Pole (1963)
- The Past That Would Not Die (1965)
- Incredible Victory: The Battle of Midway (1967)
- The Dawn's Early Light: The War of 1812 and the Battle That Inspired Francis Scott Key to Write "The Star-Spangled Banner" (1972)
- Lonely Vigil: Coastwatchers of the Solomons (Bluejacket Books) (1977)
- The Miracle of Dunkirk: The True Story of Operation Dynamo (1982)
- The Night Lives On: Thoughts, Theories and Revelations about the Sinking of the "Unsinkable" Ship – Titanic (1986)
