= Research and Practice in Social Sciences =

Research and Practice in Social Sciences is an academic online journal on social science whose objective is to give scientists a forum to publish their research and involve readers from around the world. The journal aims to promote an engaging academic dialogue around both highlighted themes and perspectives, as well as those that need to be brought to attention.

The editor-in-chief of the journal is Dr. Aditya Raj.
