= Youth & Society =

- Language: English
- Edited by: Marc Zimmerman

Publication details
- History: 1969-present
- Publisher: SAGE Publications
- Frequency: Quarterly
- Impact factor: 2.13 (2017)

Standard abbreviations
- ISO 4: Youth Soc.

Indexing
- ISSN: 0044-118X
- LCCN: 73011617
- OCLC no.: 8797084

Links
- Journal homepage; Online access; Online archive

Youth & Society is a peer-reviewed academic journal that publishes papers in the field of sociology. The journal's editor is Marc Zimmerman (University of Michigan). It has been in publication since 1969 and is currently published by SAGE Publications.

== Scope ==
Youth & Society focuses on issues related to the second decade of life. The interdisciplinary journal covers transitional issues from childhood to adolescence and from adolescence to adulthood as well as the social, contextual, and political factors that influence both healthy and harmful adolescent development.

== Abstracting and indexing ==
Youth & Society is abstracted and indexed in, among other databases: SCOPUS, and the Social Sciences Citation Index. According to the Journal Citation Reports, its 2017 impact factor is 2.13, ranking it 28 out of 146 journals in the category 'Sociology'. and 13 out of 98 journals in the category 'Social Sciences, Interdisciplinary'. and 8 out of 40 journals in the category 'Social Issues'.
