= ICAP/4 =

ICAP/4 is a family of commercial SPICE analog circuit simulation software developed and sold by Intusoft for use on personal computers. It is Intusoft's fourth generation analog and mixed signal circuit simulation package and is used in electronic design automation.

All of the ICAP/4 products incorporate the Intusoft IsSpice4 simulation engine, which is based on Berkeley SPICE 3 analog simulation with the Georgia Tech XSPICE event simulator model. The original IsSpice simulator was created in 1985, however the current version offers many distinct advantages over its Berkeley SPICE predecessor.
