= Gender and Research =

- Discipline: Gender studies
- Language: Czech, English, Slovak
- Edited by: Zuzana Uhde

Publication details
- History: 2000-present
- Publisher: Institute of Sociology of the Czech Academy of Sciences
- Frequency: Biannual
- Open access: Yes

Standard abbreviations
- ISO 4: Gend. Res.

Indexing
- ISSN: 2570-6578 (print); 2570-6586 (web)
- OCLC no.: 1047926155

Links
- Journal homepage; Online access; Online archive

Gender and Research (Czech title: Gender a výzkum) is a biannual peer-reviewed academic journal published by the Institute of Sociology of the Czech Academy of Sciences. It is a transdisciplinary journal with a focus on feminist theory and gender studies. The journal was established in 2000 as Gender, rovné příležitosti, výzkum/Gender and Research. The journal focusses on Central and Eastern Europe as well as other global macro-regions. Articles are published in Czech, Slovak, or English. The journal publishes scientific articles, essays, book reviews, scholarly interviews, and conference news. The editor-in-chief is Zuzana Uhde (Czech Academy of Sciences). The journal is abstracted and indexed in Scopus and other databases. It is an open access journal listed in the DOAJ.
