= Society and Culture in South Asia =

- Discipline: Sociology
- Language: English
- Edited by: Sasanka Perera

Publication details
- History: 2015
- Publisher: SAGE Publications (India)
- Frequency: Bi-annual

Standard abbreviations
- ISO 4: Soc. Cult. South Asia

Indexing
- ISSN: 2393-8617 (print); 2394-9872 (web)

Links
- Journal homepage; Online access; Online archive

Society and Culture in South Asia is a peer-reviewed journal publishing articles in the fields of sociology, social anthropology in the main, and sociology of education, sociology of medicine, arts and aesthetics, cultural studies, sociology of mass media, sociology of law, urban studies inter alia.

It is published twice a year by SAGE Publications in association with South Asian University, New Delhi.

This journal is a member of the Committee on Publication Ethics (COPE).

== Abstracting and indexing ==
Society and Culture in South Asia is abstracted and indexed in:

- J-Gate
- Scopus
