= International Carbon Action Partnership =

The International Carbon Action Partnership (ICAP) is an international cooperative forum founded in 2007 by more than 15 government representatives. It brings together states and sub-national jurisdictions that have implemented or are planning to implement emissions trading systems (ETS). Then-Governor of California, Arnold Schwarzenegger, expressed at ICAP's founding ceremony:

"This first-of-its-kind partnership will provide more incentives for clean-tech investment and economic growth while not letting polluters off the hook. And it will help renew the health of our planet."

ICAP includes members from various jurisdictions such as the European Union, the Western Climate Initiative (WCI), the Regional Greenhouse Gas Initiative (RGGI), New Zealand, and the Tokyo Metropolitan Government. It provides a platform for governments to share their practical experiences and the latest knowledge on ETS. ICAP intends to work closely with the global Open Coalition on Compliance Carbon Markets, and Brazil's membership in ICAP should facilitate it.

== Governance ==
ICAP functions as an open forum of governments and public authorities working on cap and trade systems. The main bodies of ICAP are the Plenary and the Steering Committee. The day-to-day work is supported by the ICAP Secretariat based in Berlin, Germany, under the guidance of the ICAP Co-Chairs.

== Objectives ==
ICAP aims to:

- Share best practices and learning from each other's experience of ETSs
- Help policymakers recognize ETS design compatibility issues and opportunities for the establishment of an ETS at an early stage
- Facilitate possible future linking of trading programs
- Highlight the key role of cap and trade as an effective climate policy response
- Build and strengthen partnerships amongst governments.

== Activities ==
ICAP's work focuses on three pillars: technical dialogue, ETS knowledge sharing, and capacity building activities.

=== Technical dialogue ===
Relevant topics addressed under ICAP's technical dialogue include, for example, linking ETS, allocation methods, carbon capture and utilization, offsets, and carbon leakage. Events under this work stream bring together representatives from ICAP jurisdictions with international and local experts to share their expertise on technical issues and discuss measures to contribute to furthering a global carbon market.

=== ETS knowledge sharing ===
ICAP acts as a knowledge sharing hub, disseminating information on existing and planned ETS, as well as the general benefits and design aspects of an ETS. Addressing the growing demand for reliable and detailed information on emissions trading worldwide, ICAP developed an interactive ICAP ETS Map, which offers an up-to-date overview of existing ETSs. Moreover, the ICAP Status Report: Emissions Trading Worldwide provides factsheets on all existing and planned ETSs and includes infographics to allow for an easy comparison of systems. Policymakers and carbon market experts also share their insight into key milestones in setting up and running an ETS. Additionally, ICAP runs workshops and side events at the United Nations Climate Change Conferences.

=== Capacity building ===
Since 2009, ICAP has been actively engaged in capacity building for emerging and developing countries by organizing training courses. These courses are designed for participants from emerging and developing countries and focus on technical issues related to designing and implementing carbon cap and trade systems. The ICAP courses provide an intensive ten-day to two-week-long introduction to all aspects of the design and implementation of emissions trading systems as a tool to mitigate greenhouse gas emissions.

== Members and observers ==
As of 9 February 2026, ICAP had 36 full members and 9 observers.

=== Members ===
==== Europe ====
- Austria, Denmark, European Commission, France, Germany, Greece, Ireland, Italy, Netherlands, Norway, Portugal, Spain, Sweden, Switzerland, United Kingdom

==== North America ====
- Regional Greenhouse Gas Initiative (RGGI): Maine, Maryland, Massachusetts, New York, Vermont
- Western Climate Initiative (WCI): British Columbia, California, Manitoba, Ontario, Québec
- Other North American Jurisdictions: Arizona, New Jersey, New Mexico, Oregon, Washington

==== South America ====
- Brazil

==== Asia Pacific ====
- Australia, New Zealand, Tokyo Metropolitan Government

=== Observers ===
- Canada, Chile, Japan, Kazakhstan, Mexico, Republic of Korea, Singapore, Ukraine

== ICAP Status Report ==
The ICAP Status Report is an annual publication by the International Carbon Action Partnership that provides an overview of emissions trading worldwide. The report covers developments in emissions trading schemes globally, including key figures, infographics, and detailed factsheets on various ETS systems. It highlights the diversity and flexibility of emissions trading across different jurisdictions with varying geographical scope, economic profiles, and energy mixes. The report is available for public access and serves as a valuable resource for understanding the current state of emissions trading.

- 2024 Status Report
- 2023 Status Report
- 2022 Status Report
- 2021 Status Report
- 2020 Status Report
