= Electronic Journal of Sociology =

- Discipline: Sociology
- Language: English
- Edited by: Michael Sosteric, Adam Rafalovich

Publication details
- History: 1994–2008
- Publisher: ICAAP

Standard abbreviations
- ISO 4: Electron. J. Sociol.

Indexing
- OCLC no.: 34297444

Links
- Journal homepage

The Electronic Journal of Sociology was an online open access academic journal of sociology. It was established in 1994 by Michael Sosteric. Andreas Scheider was editor-in-chief until 2004, when Sosteric returned and Adam Rafalovich became co-editor-in-chief. The journal implemented a new approach in 2004 whereby it decided to publish three tiers of articles: fully reviewed original articles at tier 1, editorially-reviewed reviews and commentaries at tier 2, and editorially-reviewed other works, including original papers, at tier 3. Although the journal "achieved international recognition", as an electronic journal it faced barriers.

In 1996, the journal was criticized by its rival, Sociological Research Online, which suggested that its conventional approach to reviewing articles was more rigorous. The Electronic Journal of Sociology had adopted a forum with which an author could respond to the feedback or criticism of the reviewer. Its editorial board responded, speculating that the rival journal, which was affiliated with SAGE Publishing, might feel threatened by their open access and lack of traditional publishing ties. In 2008, publication was suspended.

The journal was indexed in SocINDEX.
