= Sociological Insight =

University of Texas research journal

Sociological Insight is a fully refereed reviewed undergraduate research journal sponsored by The University of Texas at Austin. The journal publishes first-rate undergraduate research from all over the world on topics with sociological relevance, broadly defined. Around seven academic manuscripts are published annually at the end of the spring academic semester. Submitters are entered into a paper competition and the top three papers are awarded monetary prizes.

Sociological Insight is currently the only undergraduate research journal in sociology which caters to undergraduate researchers worldwide. Each academic manuscript is reviewed by at least a faculty member, a graduate student, and an undergraduate, selected from all over the United States. Sociological Insight also features research notes and reviews of recent books in the social sciences. The first issue of Sociological Insight was published in May 2009.
