= International Consortium for the Advancement of Academic Publication =

Non-profit publisher of academic journals hosted at Athabasca University

International Consortium for the Advancement of Academic Publication (ICAAP) is non-profit publisher of academic journals, hosted at Athabasca University, Canada. It was founded as International Consortium for Alternative Academic Publication in 1998 by Mike Sosteric. It uses Open Journal Systems.

== Notable journals ==
Some notable journals published by the consortium are:

- Australasian Journal of Educational Technology
- Canadian Journal for Traditional Music
- Electronic Journal of Sociology
- International Journal of Baudrillard Studies
- Journal of Research Practice
- Radical Pedagogy
- E-JASL: The Electronic Journal of Academic and Special Librarianship
