= Fred Davis (sociologist) =

American sociologist (1925 – 1993)

- Born: 1925; Brooklyn, N.Y, US
- Died: January 29, 1993 (aged 67–68); San Diego, California, US
- Scientific career
- Fields: Sociology

Fred Davis (1925–1993) was an American sociologist known for his work in medical sociology, symbolic interactionism, and the sociology of culture. Recognized as a member of the “Second Chicago School", Davis's studies into collective behavior, stigmatization, and cultural change have left an enduring mark on the field of sociology. He is also known for his research into the sociology of occupation, sociology of nostalgia, and sociology of cultural phenomena (e.g. hippies and fashion).

== Early life and education ==
Born in Brooklyn in 1925, Davis was raised and educated in the New York public school system, later attending Brooklyn College. His growing interest in society led him to pursue graduate studies in sociology at the University of Chicago during the late 1940s and early 1950s. There, he immersed himself in the rich intellectual tradition that would shape his later research, culminating in the award of a Ph.D. in 1958: Polio in the Family: A Study in Crisis and Family Process; University of Chicago, Department of Sociology (1958).

== Academic career ==
Davis's early work focused on the sociology of health and illness. He was the Director of the Nursing Careers Project at the San Francisco Medical Center, University of California. His 1966 collection The Nursing Profession: Five Sociological Essays includes essays from Esther Lucile Brown, William A. Glaser, Hans O. Mauksch (then Dean of the College of Liberal Arts, Illinois I.T), Virginia L. Olesen, Anselm Strauss, Elvi Whittaker and himself, examines the social organization of nursing and its professionalization in the mid-20th century. In 1972, he published Illness, Interaction and the Self, an ethnographic study of how individuals negotiate identity and social roles in the context of health challenges.

In the late 1970s and early 1990s, Davis turned to cultural sociology, notably exploring nostalgia and fashion as social phenomena. Yearning for Yesterday: A Sociology of Nostalgia (1979) offered a systematic analysis of how collective memory functions to restore continuity amid social disruption.

Davis's academic journey began as he joined the sociology group at the University of California, San Francisco between 1960 and 1965. He held academic positions at several universities, and teaching and research focused on the intersections of culture, identity, and social behavior. In 1975, he joined the Department of Sociology at the University of California, San Diego. At UC San Diego, Davis served as department chair from 1976 to 1978 and was credited with establishing the department as a leading center for cultural and collective behavior studies. He retired in 1991.

Davis made substantial contributions across several interrelated areas of sociology:

- Medical sociology: Davis's early work examining the experiences of polio victims culminated in the classic study Passage Through Crisis: Polio Victims and Their Families (1963/1990). This study offered a detailed analysis of how chronic illness impacts individuals and reshapes family dynamics.
- Symbolic interactionism: Influenced by Herbert Blumer and Everett Hughes, Davis explored the nuances of everyday interactions. As an example, his influential paper, “Deviance Disavowal: The Management of Strained Interaction by the Visibly Handicapped,” remains a cornerstone in understanding how individuals negotiate stigmatized identities.
- Occupational sociology: Drawing on personal experience—having worked as a taxi driver—Davis authored “The Cabdriver and His Fare,” a perceptive study of transient interpersonal relations and the contingencies of occupational life.
- Cultural analysis: Later in his career, Davis shifted focus to broader cultural dynamics, authoring Yearning for Yesterday: A Sociology of Nostalgia (1979). In this work, he examined the sociological underpinnings of nostalgia and the role of collective memory in shaping personal identity and community values.

== Legacy and impact ==
Davis published numerous articles on the symbolic aspects of collective behavior. His studies on how individuals manage social stigma and collective change influence contemporary research on identity, culture, and social interaction. Davis's legacy is evident both in the continued relevance of his publications and in the generations of sociologists inspired by his empirical and theoretical contributions.

== Selected publications ==
- "The Cabdriver and His Fare: Facets of a Fleeting Relationship" (1959); American Journal of Sociology. 65 (2): 158–165."
- “Deviance Disavowal: The Management of Strained Interaction by the Visibly Handicapped” (paper) (1961) in Social Problems. 9 (2): 120–132
- Passage Through Crisis: Polio Victims and Their Families (1963 / new edition 1990)
- The Nursing Profession: Five Sociological Essays and Illness, Interaction and the Self (Ed.) (1966)
- "On youth subcultures: the Hippie Variant" (paper)(1971); General Learning Press (the University of Michigan)
- Illness, Interaction, and the Self (1972); Wadsworth Publishing Company
- Yearning for Yesterday: A Sociology of Nostalgia (1979), The Free Press (Macmillan)
- On the Symbolic in the Symbolic Interaction (1982); Symbolic Interaction, 5(1), 111–126
- Herbert Blumer and the Study of Fashion: A Reminiscence and A Critique (1991), Symbolic Interaction, Vol. 14, No. 1, pp. 1–21
- Fashion, Culture, and Identity (1992), University of Chicago Press
