= Symbolic Interaction (journal) =

- Discipline: Symbolic interactionism
- Language: English
- Edited by: Lisa-Jo van den Scott

Publication details
- History: 1978-present
- Publisher: Wiley-Blackwell
- Frequency: Quarterly
- Impact factor: 1.6 (2022)

Standard abbreviations
- ISO 4: Symb. Interact.

Indexing
- ISSN: 0195-6086 (print); 1533-8665 (web)
- LCCN: 79644230
- JSTOR: 01956086
- OCLC no.: 311178383

Links
- Journal homepage; Online access; Online archive

Symbolic Interaction is a quarterly peer-reviewed academic journal published by Wiley-Blackwell. It was established in 1978, originally published by the University of California Press, and covers research and theoretical developments concerned with symbolic interactionism. It is the official publication of the Society for the Study of Symbolic Interaction. The editor-in-chief is Lisa-Jo K. van den Scott (Memorial University of Newfoundland).

== Abstracting and indexing ==
The journal is abstracted and indexed in:

- AgeLine
- Criminal Justice Abstracts
- Current Contents/Social & Behavioral Sciences
- PsycINFO
- Sociological Abstracts
- Scopus
- Social Sciences Citation Index

According to the Journal Citation Reports, the journal has a 2013 impact factor of 0.519.
