= Journal of Applied Social Science =

- Discipline: Sociology
- Language: English
- Edited by: Bruce K Friesen

Publication details
- History: 2007-present
- Publisher: SAGE Publications
- Frequency: Semiannually

Standard abbreviations
- ISO 4: J. Appl. Soc. Sci.

Indexing
- ISSN: 1936-7244 (print); 1937-0245 (web)
- LCCN: 2007214323
- OCLC no.: 122940801

Links
- Journal homepage; Online access; Online archive

The Journal of Applied Social Science is the official peer-reviewed academic journal of the Association for Applied and Clinical Sociology. It covers research in applied social science fields. It was established in 2007 and is published by SAGE Publications. The editor-in-chief is Bruce K. Friesen (University of Tampa).

== Abstracting and indexing ==
The journal is abstracted and indexed in Applied Social Sciences Index and Abstracts, Sociological Abstracts, and Scopus.
