= Naim =

- Pronunciation: /ˈnɑːʔiːm/
- Gender: Male

Origin
- Origin: Arabic, Hebrew
- Meaning: In Arabic: Happiness and comfort In Hebrew: Pleasant

Other names
- Related names: Noam, Noa, Naamah, Naomi, Naima

Naim (also spelled Na'im, Naïm, Nayeem, Naeem, Naiem, Nahim, Naheem, Nyhiem, Nihiem, Nyheim, Niheem, Nahiem or Nyiem) (Arabic: نعیم, Hebrew: נעים) is a masculine given name and surname of Jewish and Arabic origin. Notable people with the name include:

== Given name ==
=== Naeem ===
- Naeem M. Abdurrahman (born 1954), Libyan nuclear scientist, engineer, and academic
- Naeem Ahmed (born 1952), Pakistani cricketer
- Naeem Akhtar, multiple people
- Naeem Amjad (born 1965), Pakistani field hockey player
- Naeem Anjum (born 1987), Pakistani cricketer
- Naeem Anwar (born 1972), Pakistani jurist
- Naeem Ashraf (born 1972), Pakistani cricketer
- Naeem Baig (born 1952), Pakistani short story writer
- Naeem Baloch, Afghan politician
- Naeem Bokhari (born 1948), Pakistani television host and lawyer
- Naeem Hussain Chattha, Pakistani politician
- Naeem Ejaz, Pakistani politician
- Naeem Ullah Gill (born 1985), Pakistani politician
- Naeem Gul (born 1954), Pakistani footballer
- Naeemul Haque (1949–2020), Pakistani politician
- Naeem U. Hasan, Pakistani diplomat
- Naeem Hashmi (1914–1976), Pakistani film actor
- Naeem Islam (born 1986), Bangladeshi cricketer
- Naeem Islam (cricketer, born 1994) (born 1994), Bangladeshi cricketer
- Naeem Issa (1933–2025), Egyptian actor
- Naeem Jack (born 2007), South African sprint hurdler
- Naeem Sabir Jamaldini (died 2011), Pakistani social worker and human rights activist
- Na'eem Jeenah (born 1965), South African political activist
- Naeem Khan (born 1958), American fashion designer
- Naeem Khan (cricketer) (born 1971), Pakistani cricketer
- Naeem Ahmad Khan (1928–2013), Pakistani nuclear physicist
- Naeem Ahmed Kharal (1957–2026), Pakistani politician
- Naeem Khalid Lodhi, Pakistani army general
- Naeem Masih (born 1987), Pakistani para-athlete
- Naeem Mohaiemen (born 1969), Bangladeshi writer, artist, and film director
- Naeem Mohammed (born 1996), Ghanaian footballer
- Naeem-ud-Deen Muradabadi (1887–1948), Indian jurist, scholar, mufti, Quranic exegete, and educator
- Naeem Murr (born 1965), British novelist
- Na'eem Offord, American college football player
- Naeem Rahim (born 1976), Pakistani-American nephrologist and musician
- Naeem Ashraf Raja (born 1967), Pakistani conservationists
- Naeem-ur-Rehman (born 1982), Pakistani cricketer
- Naeem Abbas Rufi, Pakistani singer
- Naeem Saad (born 1957), Kuwaiti footballer
- Naeem Saddam (born 1968), Iraqi footballer
- Naeem Sheth (born 1980), Zimbabwean cricketer
- Naeem Siddiqui (1916–2002), Pakistani Islamic scholar, writer, and politician
- Naeem Tahir (born 1937), Pakistani actor
- Naeem Sakhi Tanoli, Pakistani politician
- Naeem Triplin (born 2001), birth name of Eem Triplin, American rapper and record producer
- Naeem Wardak (born 1985), Afghan Taliban spokesperson
- Naeem Zamindar, Pakistani businessman

=== Naeemuddin ===
- Naeemuddin (Pakistani cricketer) (born 1981), Pakistani first-class cricketer
- Naeemuddin Aslam (born 1982), Emirati cricketer

=== Naeim ===
- Naeim Ghalili (born 1962), Iranian actor and filmmaker
- Naeim Giladi (1926–2010), Iraqi Jewish author
- Naeim Saadavi (born 1969), Iranian football player and coach

=== Naim ===
- Naïm Aarab (born 1988), Belgian football player
- Naïm Abou-Jaoudé (born 1966), Lebanese banker
- Naim Ahmed, Bangladeshi police officer
- Na'im Akbar (born 1944), American psychologist
- Naim Allaj (born 1950), Albanian footballer
- Naim Antaki (1971–1903), Syrian politician
- Naim Araidi (1950–2015), Israeli writer
- Naim Ateek (born 1937), Palestinian priest
- Naim Attallah (1931–2021), Palestinian businessman
- Naim Van Attenhoven (born 2003), Belgian footballer
- Naim Beka (1966–1999), Kosovar army officer
- Naimuzzaman Bhuiyan (born 1973), Bangladeshi politician
- Naïm Byar (born 2005), French-Moroccan footballer
- Naim Dangoor (1914–2015), British businessman
- Naim Dhifallah (born 1982), Tunisian basketball player
- Naim Farouqi (born 1960), Afghan detainee
- Naim Frashëri (1846–1900), Albanian romantic poet
- Naim Frashëri (actor) (1923–1975), Albanian actor
- Naim García (born 2002), Spanish footballer
- Naim Hadžiabdić (1918–1987), Bosnian cleric
- Naim ibn Hammad (died 843), Arab Hadith collector
- Naim Ul Hasan (born 1971), Indian politician
- Naimul Islam (born 2000), Bangladeshi cricketer
- Naim Jerliu (born 1969), Kosovan public health specialist and politician
- Naïm Kattan (1928–2021), Jewish Iraqi-born Canadian writer
- Naim Khader (1939–1981), Palestinian Fatah member
- Naim Akhtar Khan (born 1959), Indian-French physiologist
- Naim Kryeziu (1918–2010), Albanian football player
- Naim Kuchi (born 1940), Afghan detainee
- Naïm Laidouni (born 2002), French-Algerian footballer
- Naim Maloku (born 1958), Kosovar politician
- Naïm Matoug (born 2003), Dutch footballer
- Naim Moghabghab (1911–1959), Lebanese political leader and an independence hero
- Naim Moktar (born 1994), Malaysian politician
- Na'im ibn Musa, Iraqi mathematician
- Naim Nova (born 1940), Albanian actor, director, and producer
- Naim Popal (born 1954), Afghan musician
- Naim Qassem (born 1953), Lebanese Shia cleric and politician
- Naimur Rahman (born 1974), Bangladeshi politician and cricketer
- Naimul Islam Ratul, Bangladeshi musician
- Naim al-Rubaye (born 1970), Iraqi politician
- Naim Sharifi (born 1992), Russian-Tajik footballer
- Naïm Sliti (born 1992), French-Tunisian footballer
- Naim Süleymanoğlu (1967–2017), Turkish weightlifter
- Naim Talhouk, Lebanese writer and poet
- Naim Talu (1919–1998), Turkish politician and Prime Minister
- Naim Terbunja (born 1984), Swedish boxer
- Naím Thomas (born 1980), Spanish singer and actor
- Naim Uddin, Bangladeshi field hockey player
- Naim Ulmasov (born 1992), Tajik footballer
- Naim Uludoğan (1911–2010), Turkish artist, sculptor, and cartographic officer

== Surname ==
=== Naeem ===
- Gilaman Wazir (real name Hazrat Naeem; 1992–2024), Afghan Pashto poet
- Hussein Naeem (1987–2007), Lebanese football player
- Mohammad Naeem (disambiguation), multiple people

=== Naim ===
- Abdullahi Ahmed An-Na'im (born 1946), Sudanese lawyer and writer
- Armon Ben-Naim (born 1990), Israeli football player
- C. M. Naim (1936–2025), American writer
- Moisés Naím (born 1952), Venezuelan writer
- Omar Naim (born 1977), Lebanese film director and screenwriter
- Ra'anan Naim (1935–2009), Israeli politician
- Yael Naim (born 1978), Israeli singer
- Yuval Naim (born 1967), Israeli former football player and manager
