= Noemi =

Noemi or Noémi may refer to:

- Noémie, a female given name of French origin; also spelt Noémi
- Naomi (given name), a given name in many languages; also spelt Noemi
- Noémi (novel), an 1895 historical novel by Sabine Baring-Gould
- Noemi (singer) (born 1982), Italian singer and music video director
  - Noemi (EP), by Noemi
- SS Noemi (1895), a steamship in service 1926–1930
- SS Noemi (1942) a steamship in service 1961–1965
- 703 Noëmi, a minor planet orbiting the Sun
- "Noémi", a part of the novel The Man with the Golden Touch by Mór Jókai

== See also ==
- Naomi (disambiguation)
