= Irving Berlin soundtrack filmography =

This is a list of movies that used the music of songwriter Irving Berlin (1888–1989). This list includes only feature films from Berlin's lifetime.

== 1920s ==
Year	Title of Film	Age of Berlin	Info
1922	The Toll of the Sea	34	Some sources indicate Irving Berlin wrote the score for this color silent film.
1927	The Jazz Singer	39	Song Blue Skies written in 1926.
1928	Show People	40	Song You'd Be Surprised (1919) (uncredited)
1928	The Awaking	40	
1929	Lady of Pavements	41	
1929	Coquette	41	
1929	The Cocoanuts	41	
1929	The Time, The Place and the Girl	41	
1929	Glorifying the American Girl	41	
1929	Metro Movietone Revue	41	
1930	Puttin' On the Ritz	42	Harry Richman's version of Puttin' On the Ritz was a #1 hit song.
1930	Mammy	42	
1930	Our Blushing Brides	42	Writer, Puttin' On the Ritz
1930	Reaching for the Moon	42	
1931	Body and Soul	43	Early Humphrey Bogart film. Irving Berlin uncredited.
1932	Young Bride	44	
1932	Westward Passage	44	Song What'll I Do (1924)
1932	Marrily We Go to Hell	44	
1932	Roar of the Dragon	44	
1933	The Life of Jimmy Dolan	45	
1934	Wharf Angel	46	Uncredited.
1934	Kid Millions	46	Mandy, uncredited.
1935	Top Hat	47	Movie introduced the song Cheek to Cheek.
1936	Follow the Fleet	48	
1936	The Great Ziegfeld	48	Winner of Academy Award for best picture.
1937	Way Out West	49	Uncredited.
1937	On the Avenue	49	
1938	Alexander's Ragtime Band	50	
1938	The Amazing Dr. Clitterhouse	50	Uncredited song, How Dry Am I.
1939	Idiot's Delight	51	Uncredited, Puttin' On the Ritz.
1939	The Story of Vernon and Irene Castle	51	
1939	Second Fiddle	51	
1941	Louisiana Purchase	53	
1942	Moontide	54	Uncredited.
1942	Home in Wyomin'	54	
1942	The Pride of the Yankees	54	Uncredited.
1942	Holiday Inn	54	
1943	December 7th	55	
1943	Hello Frisco, Hello	55	
1943	This is the Army	55	
1944	Christmas Holiday	56	An early movie with Gene Kelly portraying a dramatic role.
1944	Blithe Spirit	56	
1946	The Jolson Story	58	
1946	Blue Skies	58	The second and last movie with Bing Crosby and Fred Astaire paired and the only to filmed in Technicolor.
1946	It's A Wonderful Life	58	Uncredited.
1947	The Fabulous Dorseys	59	
1948	Big City	60	Uncredited.
1948	Easter Parade	60	
1949	Jolson Sings Again	61	Uncredited.
1950	Annie Get Your Gun	62	
1951	It's a Big Country	63	Uncredited.
1951	Meet Danny Wilson	63	
1952	Belles on Their Toes	64	
1953	The I Don't Care Girl	65	
