= Noam =

Noam (Hebrew: נעם/נועם) is a Hebrew name that means "gentleness", "pleasantness" or "peacefulness". It started as the male version of Na'omi (English: "Naomi" or "Noémie"), but today is a very common Hebrew name for people of any gender.

== People with the given name Noam ==
=== Political activism ===
- Noam Bramson (born 1969), Mayor of New Rochelle.
- Noam Chomsky (born 1928), American political activist, linguist, and philosopher.
- Noam Federman (born 1969), Israeli right-wing political activist.

=== Television and film ===
- Noam Murro (born 1961), Israeli American director.
- Noam Gonick (born 1973), Canadian film director.
- Sacha Noam Baron Cohen (born 1971), British comedian, actor, writer and producer.
- Noam Pitlik (1932-1999), American television director and character actor.
- Noam Zylberman (born 1973), Israeli-born voice actor.
- Noam Jenkins, Canadian actor.
- Noam Shuster-Eliassi (born 1986/87), Israeli comedian and activist.

=== Music ===
- Noam Bettan (born 1998), Israeli singer and songwriter
- Noam Jacobson (born 1975), Israeli singer, songwriter, and actor, member of group Latma
- Noam Kaniel (born 1962), Israeli musician, singer, and composer
- Noam Pikelny (born 1981), American banjoist

=== Sports ===
- Noam Dar (born 1993), Israeli-Scottish professional wrestler.
- Noam Behr (born 1975), Israeli tennis player.
- Noam Dovrat (born 2002), Israeli basketball player.
- Noam Emeran (born 2002), French football player who plays for Manchester United.
- Noam Mills (born 1986), Israeli female Olympic fencer.
- Noam Okun (born 1978), Israeli professional tennis player.
- Noam Yaacov (born 2004), Israeli–Danish player in the Israeli Basketball Premier League

=== Other fields ===
- Noam D. Elkies (born 1966), American mathematician.
- Noam Gottesman (born 1961), wealthy businessman living in the United Kingdom.
- Noam Lanir (born 1967), Israeli entrepreneur.
- Noam Nisan (born 1961), Israeli computer scientist.
- Noam Sienna, author and Jewish educator.
- Noam Sohlberg (born 1962), Israeli jurist.
- Noam T. Wasserman, American academic.

== People with the surname Noam ==
- Eli Noam (born 1946), professor at Columbia University.
- Vered Noam (born 1960), professor of Talmud at Tel Aviv University.

== Political organizations ==
- Noam Masorti Youth, part of Masorti Olami, is a Jewish youth movement with a democratically decided ideology and statement of purpose, reflecting the values of its participants. Noam offers annual summer camps for children aged 10–16, as well as year-round events and camps led by madrichim who look after the children and plan the Noam-based activities.
- Noam (political party), an Israeli political party.

== See also ==
- North America
- Naomi (disambiguation)
