= Hazel Forbes =

American actress and dancer (1910–1980)

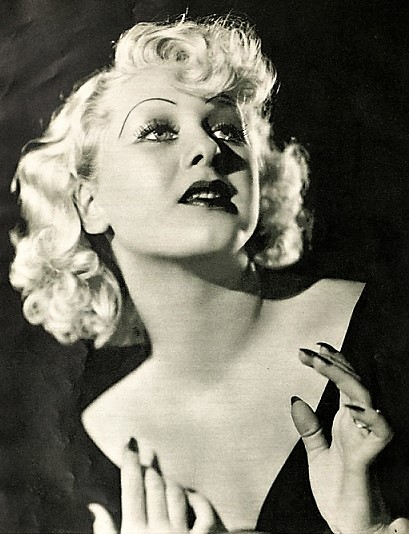
- Forbes in 1935
- Born: Hazel Froidevaux; November 26, 1910; Gettysburg, South Dakota, U.S.
- Died: November 19, 1980 (aged 69); Los Angeles, California, U.S.
- Resting place: Forest Lawn Memorial Park, Glendale, California
- Occupation: Actress
- Years active: 1927–1942
- Spouses: Harry Judson (m. 1928; div. 1930) Paul O. Richmond (m. 1931; died 1932) Harry Richman (m. 1938; div. 1942)

Hazel Forbes (born Hazel Froidevaux, November 26, 1910 – November 19, 1980) was an American dancer and actress.

== Beauty pageants ==
Her professional career began at one of the Atlantic City, New Jersey beauty pageants where she won honors as Miss Long Island. Forbes was 16 when she was chosen Miss United States in the Paris International Beauty Pageant of 1926.

== Stage ==
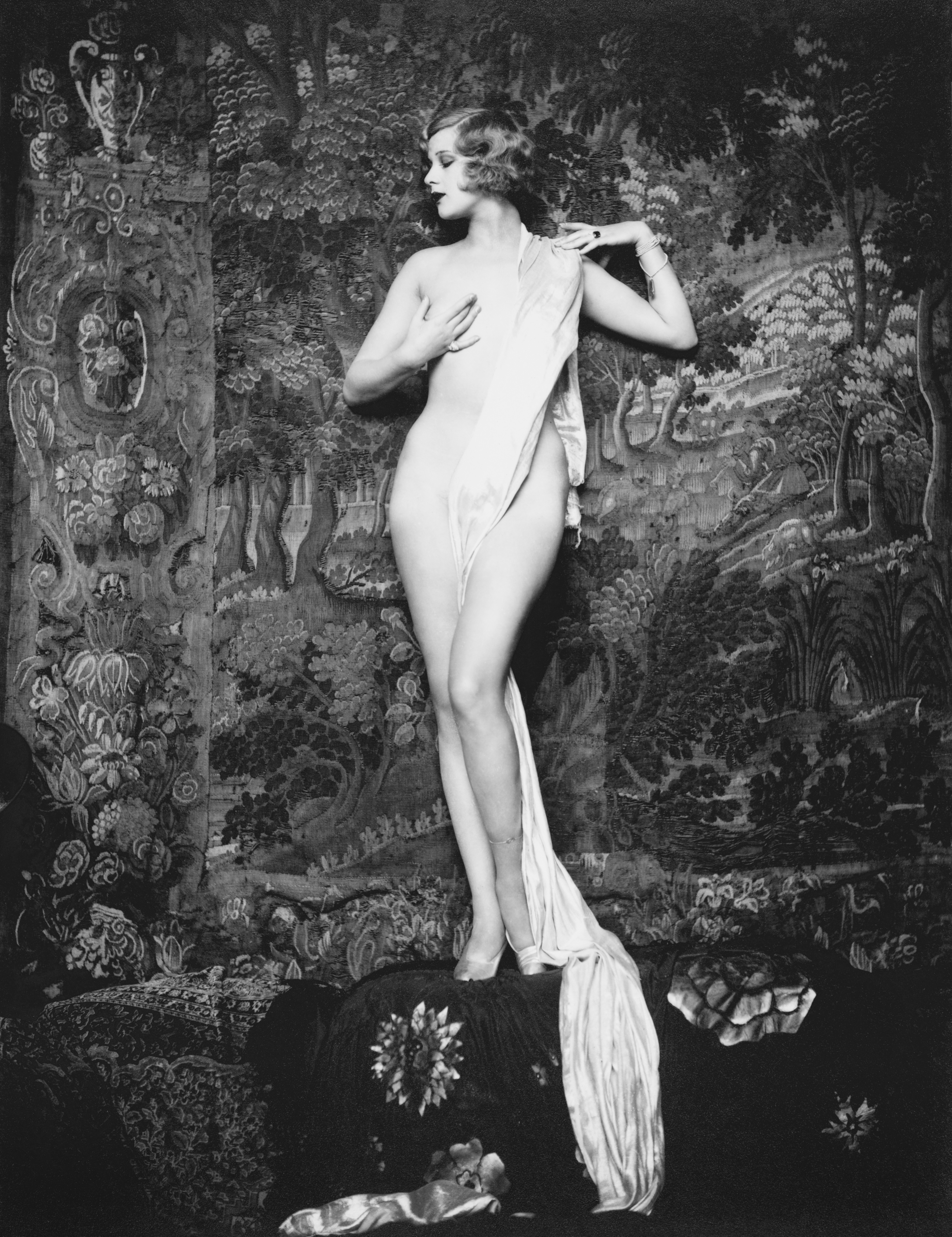
Hazel Forbes in 1928, by Alfred Cheney Johnston.

She became a showgirl in New York City at the age of 17 in 1927. She was hired away from Florenz Ziegfeld and his Ziegfeld Follies by Broadway theatre producer Earl Carroll. This was for a January 1929 production at his Earl Carroll Theatre. Carroll tempted Forbes with a substantial offer for a new dance review. Ziegfeld eventually won the struggle and Forbes starred in Whoopee! which opened December 4, 1928 and Rosalie which opened January 10, 1928, in support of Eddie Cantor. In 1930 she was in Simple Simon, a musical comedy by Guy Bolton which opened on February 18. She also appeared in a short run of "Steel" by John Wexley at the Webster Hall in 1932.

== Personal life ==
Forbes married automobile salesman, Harry Judson, in 1928 and they divorced in 1930. In 1931 she wed Paul Owen Richmond in Kennedyville, Maryland. They were happy together but Richmond died suddenly in 1932. He left Forbes a fortune estimated at $2,000,000 from his dentifrice and hair shampoo interests.

She met entertainer Harry Richman and married him on April 16, 1938, in Palm Springs, California. The maid of honor was Glenda Farrell and the best man was Joseph M. Schenck. Richman reportedly spent $30,000 on the wedding with $5,000 on flowers alone. The wedding ended in divorce in 1941. The divorce was on the grounds of "cruelty".

Playboy night-club singer Harry Richman was well known for his earlier romances with Clara Bow, Dorothy Darrell, showgirl Edith Roark, Virginia Biddle, Lina Basquette, Peggy Hopkins Joyce, and Lenore Ulric. He and Forbes shared a sumptuous home in Beechhurst, Long Island. Shortly after their wedding, Forbes contracted pneumonia and was saved, in part, through the use of the drug sulfanilimide. The couple considered adopting a baby.

By 1942, Forbes was divorced from Richman and was being wooed by millionaire Max Bamberger.

== Film ==
Forbes went to Hollywood and made a number of shorts and films. In 1929, she was in Harry Rosenthal and His Bath and Tennis Club Orchestra, 1930 she was in The Fight and Seeing-Off Service, and in 1934 she was in the movies Bachelor Bait, If This Isn't Love and Down to Their Last Yacht. She received a series of threatening letters which dissuaded her from continuing in motion pictures. She donated her salary as a movie extra to charity because of the money she was willed by Richmond.

== Death ==
Hazel Forbes died on November 19, 1980 in Los Angeles, California, a week before her 70th birthday. She is buried in the Great Mausoleum at Forest Lawn Memorial Park in Glendale, California.
