= Naiomi =

Naiomi is a female given name. Notable people with the name include:

- Naiomi Cameron, American mathematician
- Naiomi Glasses, American (Diné) textile artist and skateboarder

== See also ==
- Naomi (given name)
