= Noémie =

- Pronunciation: no-eh-mee, no-emmy
- Gender: Female

Origin
- Origin: Hebrew
- Meaning: "Pleasantness", "Loveliness"
- Region of origin: France

Other names
- Variant forms: Naomi (Biblical), Noemin (Biblical Greek), Na'omi (Biblical Hebrew), Noemi (Biblical Latin), Noemi (Czech), Naomi (English), Noemi (German), Naomi (Hebrew), Noémi (Hungarian), Noemi (Italian), Noémia (Portuguese), Noêmia (Portuguese (Brazilian)), Noemí, Nohemi (Spanish)

Noémie (Noemie, Noemi, Noémi) is a female name of Hebrew origin, derived from the Hebrew "Na'omi", meaning graceful, beautiful or beauty. Uncommon variant spellings in French include Noëmie (same pronunciation).

In abbreviated form Noemie or Noemi can be addressed as Noe, Nomi, or in baby form Noemini.

A similar name is the name Naomi, which has a slightly different meaning. Predominantly it is the French female name coming from the biblical Hebrew name Naomi (נָעֳמִי), which can mean "good, pleasant, lovely, and wisdom." In the Bible, Naomi is a character from the Book of Ruth, where her name is interpreted as "My beloved."

== Variants ==
Variant forms of Noémie
Armenian	Նոյեմի
Czech	Noemi
Dutch	Naomi
English	Naomi, Noemie, Noemi
Finnish	Noomi
French	Naomé (Belgian), Noemy, Noémi, Noémie, Noëmie
German	Noemi, Noomi
Greek	Νωεμιν
Haitian Creole	Nahomie
Hebrew	נָעֳמִי
Hungarian	Naómi, Noémi
Irish	Náoimí
Italian	Noemi
Japanese	のえみ
Persian	نائومی
Polish	Noemi
Portuguese	Noemi, Noémia, Noêmia (Brazilian)
Russian	Наоми, Ноэми
Spanish	Noemi, Noemí, Nohemi (Mexican)
Tagalog	Noemí, Naomi, Nemia

== Notable people ==
=== Noémie ===
- Noémie Brochant (born 1999), French basketball player
- Noémie Happart (born 1993), Belgian model and beauty pageant, Miss Belgium 2013
- Noémie Lafrance (born 1973), Canadian-born choreographer
- Noémie Lenoir (born 1979), French model and actress
- Noémie Lvovsky (born 1964), French film director, screenwriter and actress
- Noémie Marin (born 1984), Canadian softball and hockey player
- Noémie Mayombo (born 1991), Belgian basketball player
- Noémie Merlant (born 1988), French actress and director
- Noémie Nadaud (born 1995), French female acrobatic gymnast
- Noémi Orvos-Tóth (born 1971), Hungarian clinical psychologist and author
- Noémie Pérugia (1903–1992), French soprano
- Noémie Silberer (born 1991), Swiss figure skater
- Noémie Wiedmer (born 2007), Swiss snowboarder

=== Noemi ===
- Noemie Fox (born 1997), French-born Australian world champion and olympic champion slalom canoeist
- Noemí Gerstein
- Noemi Smilansky (1916–2016), Austro-Hungarian Empire-born Israeli painter, engraver, and illustrator
- Noemi Romero Rosario (born 2000), Spanish trampoline gymnast
- Noemi (singer)
- Noemí Rial

== See also ==
- Naomi (given name)
