= Alfred Cheney Johnston =

American photographer (1885–1971)

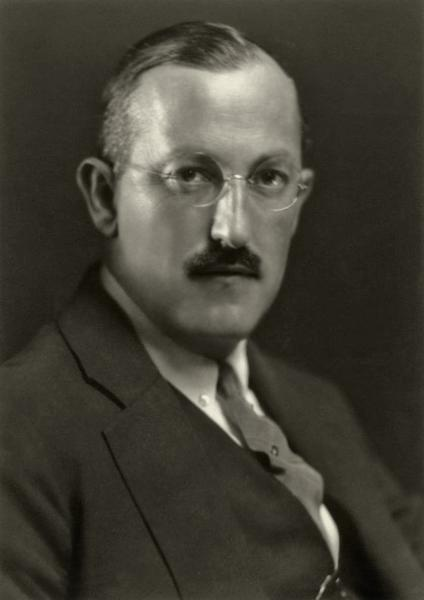
Alfred Cheney Johnston, 1921

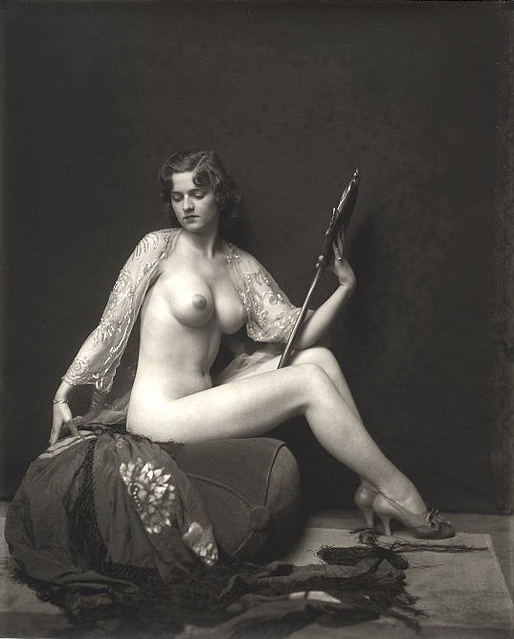
Johnston's photo of Ziegfeld Follies showgirl Dorothy Flood

Alfred Cheney Johnston (Note: Known as "Cheney" to his friends and associates) (April 8, 1885 – April 17, 1971) was a New York City-based photographer known for his portraits of Ziegfeld Follies showgirls as well as of actors and actresses from the worlds of stage and film. He also produced many images used to advertise cigarettes and other products.

== Biography ==
Johnston was born in Westchester County, New York, the son of a bank clerk. Initially he studied painting and illustration at the National Academy of Design in New York, but after graduating in 1908 (and marrying fellow student Doris Gernon the next year), his subsequent efforts to earn a living as a portrait painter did not meet with success. Instead, reportedly at the suggestion of longtime family friend and famed illustrator Charles Dana Gibson, he started to employ the camera previously used to record his painting subjects as his basic creative medium.

In approximately 1917, Johnston was hired by famed New York City live-theater showman and producer Florenz Ziegfeld as a photographer, and was affiliated with the Ziegfeld Follies until Ziegfeld's death in 1932. He also maintained his own highly successful personal commercial photo studio at various locations around New York City as well, photographing everything from aspiring actresses and society matrons to a wide range of retail commercial products—mostly men's and women's fashions—for magazine ads. He photographed many actresses and showgirls (mainly in New York City, and whether they were part of the Follies or not) during that time period. Alfred Cheney Johnston died in a car crash near his home in Connecticut on April 17, 1971, three years after the death of his longtime wife, Doris. They had no children.

== The photographer ==
For his indoor studio work, Johnston often employed a large "Century"-brand view camera that produced 11x14-inch glass-plate negatives, so a standard Johnston 11x14 photographic print was actually just a "contact print" from the negative and not enlarged at all. This size of negative afforded extremely fine image detail. (However, Johnston also is confirmed to have shot with a Graflex camera in 3-1/4 x 4-1/4-inch roll-film format; an unknown brand of 8x10 view camera; and a Zeiss Ikon camera in 120 [2-1/4 x 2-1/4-inch] film format.)

Johnston's "standard" work was used by Flo Ziegfeld for the normal advertising and promotional purposes for the Follies, and mainly consisted of individual or small-group shots of the Follies showgirls in their extravagant stage costumes. However, after Johnston's death in 1971, a huge treasure trove of extremely artistic full-nude and semi-nude full-figure studio photos (and their accompanying glass-plate negatives) was found stored at the farm near Oxford, Connecticut, where he'd lived since 1940. Most of these images (some named, mostly anonymous) were, in fact, showgirls from the Ziegfeld Follies, but such daring, unretouched full-frontal images would certainly have had no public-publication possibilities in the 1920s–1930s, so it is speculated that these were either simply his own personal artistic work, and/or done at the behest of Flo Ziegfeld for that showman's personal enjoyment.

The only book known to have been published by Alfred Cheney Johnston during his lifetime devoted to his nudes/glamour photography is the 1937 spiral-bound softcover "Enchanting Beauty", which contains 94 black-and-white photos (mostly about 7x9 inches, centered on a 9x12-inch page, although a number are cropped circular or in other designs). Unusually (compared to virtually all other examples of his work seen today on the Web or other sources, which were shot in an indoor studio in front of a flat-black or illustrated tapestry background cloth), 37 of these photos were taken outdoors along a stream or in flower-dappled fields, etc. All the shots in the book are "airbrushed" in the pubic area, to keep them legal with respect to the publishing standards of the day.

The stock-market crash of 1929 and ensuing Great Depression—combined with several unsuccessful seasons of stage productions and a variety of messy lawsuits—devastated Flo Ziegfeld's finances, and he died in July 1932. This heavily impacted Alfred Cheney Johnston's career, and likely led to his relocation to Connecticut at the end of the decade. Although he briefly operated two successive commercial photo studios there in the late 1940s/early 1950s, neither was apparently successful. It is believed that he did also continue his nude/glamour portrait work in a large converted barn/studio on his property, working with a new generation of "post-Ziegfeld" female models and stubbornly continuing to use his massive 11x14-inch view camera.

== Legacy ==
In 1960, Johnston donated a set of 245 large prints of his work to the Library of Congress in Washington, D.C. (largely nude and semi-nude Follies showgirls, performers from various Ziegfeld shows including Belle Baker, Fanny Brice, Billie Burke, Ina Claire, the Dolly Sisters, Ruth Etting, Naomi Johnson, Ruby Keeler, Helen Morgan, Marilyn Miller, Grace Moore, and Ann Pennington; some well-known actors and actresses of the 1920s/1930s including Mary Pickford, Gloria Swanson, Tyrone Power, John Barrymore, Pearl White, Barbara La Marr, Orson Welles, Clara Bow, Ethel Barrymore, Claudette Colbert, Corinne Griffith, Clara Kimball Young, Theda Bara, Mabel Normand, Helen Hayes, Norma Shearer, Anita Stewart, Lillian Gish, Dorothy Gish, Marie Prevost, Tallulah Bankhead, Mary Miles Minter, Hope Hampton; and a number of product-advertisement photos). Apparently five of them have "gone missing" over the years, although the Library still has 240 images in its Prints and Photographs division (Lot 8782).

Many years later, a considerable number of original Johnston-printed (and sometimes autographed) photographic prints and many original negatives were purchased at several auctions by at least four different American collectors/entrepreneurs. Nowadays, both original 11x14-inch ACJ prints and more recent reprints from Johnston's original negatives have commanded significant prices in both on-line auctions and at photo galleries.

== Johnston-MacFarland ==
Johnston-MacFarland Incorporated of 67 West 46th Street New York City, "Perform a Distinctive Service to Those Engaged in Theatricals" and signed showgirls like Lora Foster to management contracts.

== Photos ==
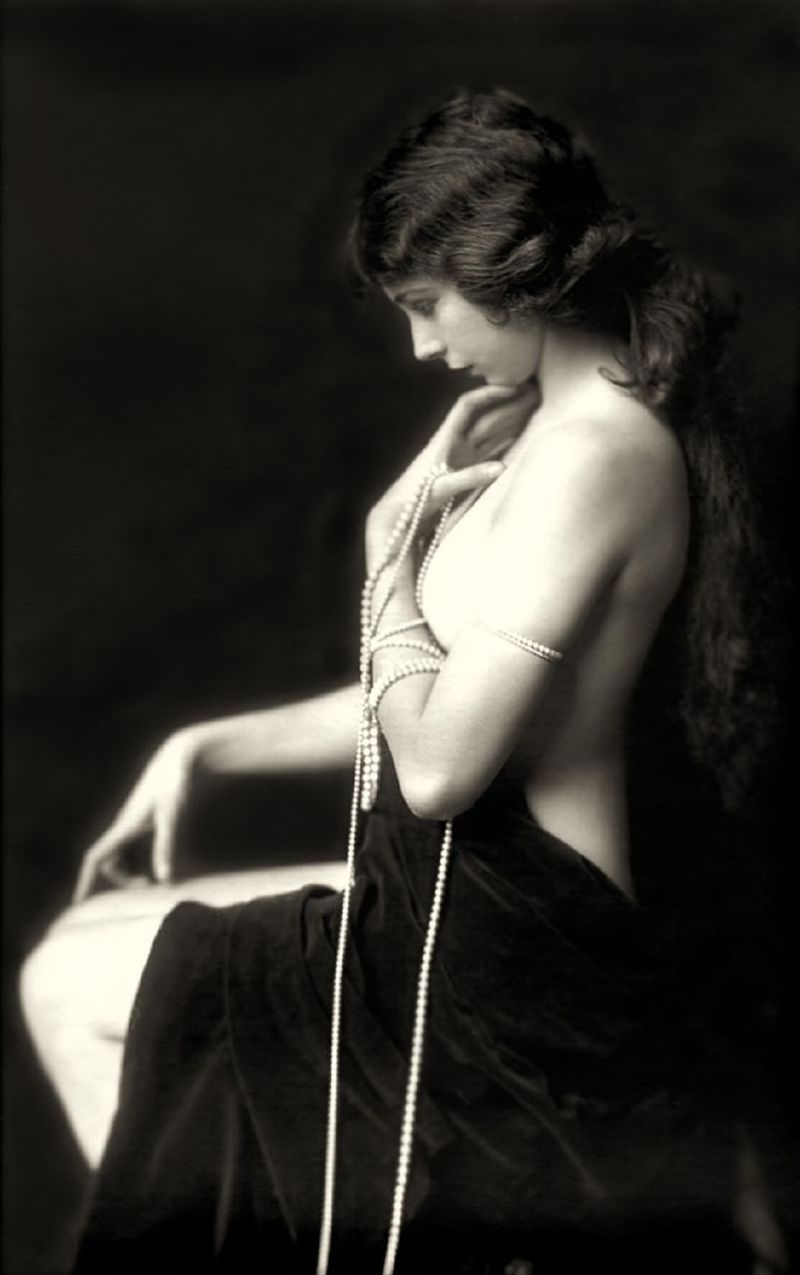
Ava Land

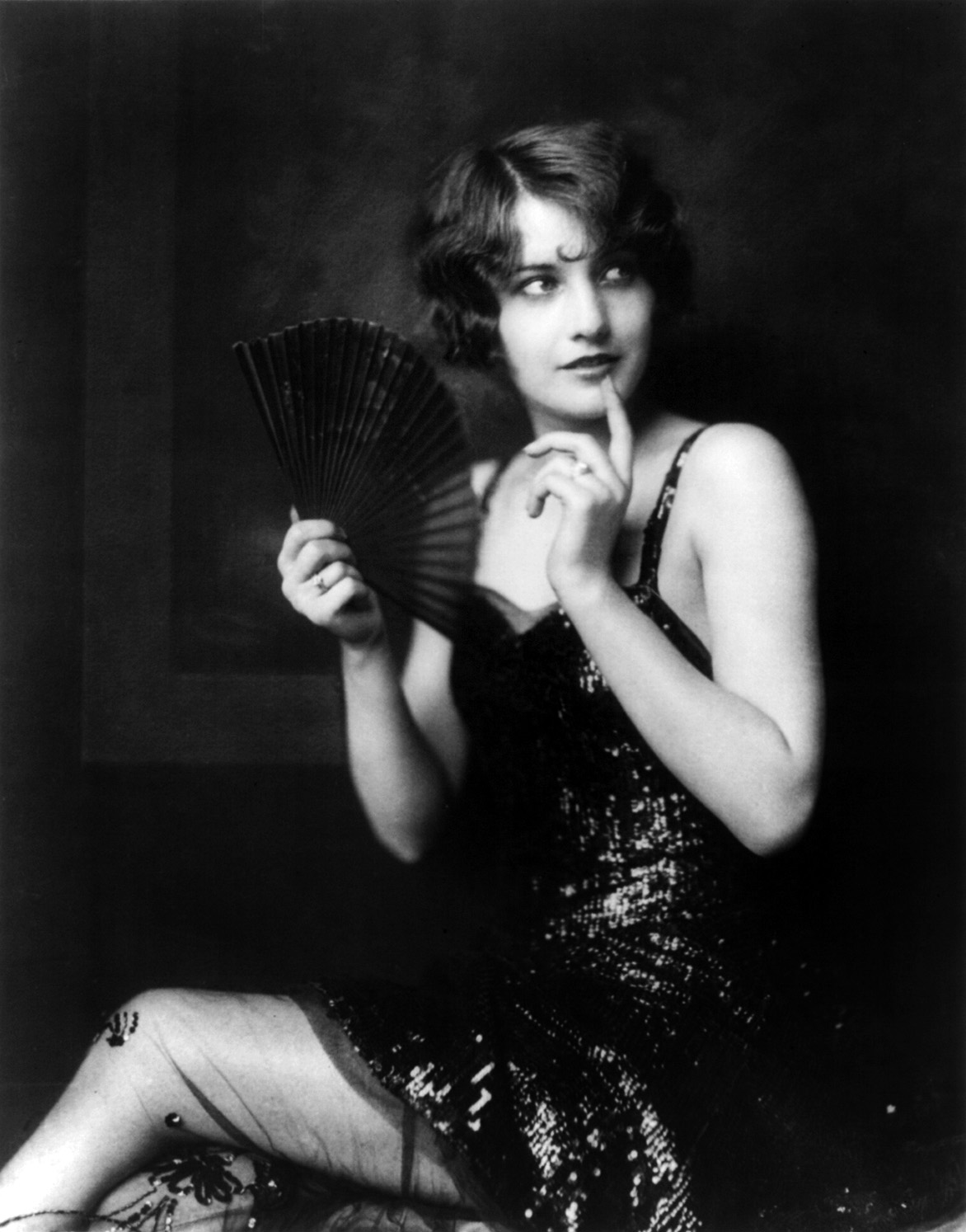
Barbara Stanwyck, a Ziegfeld girl

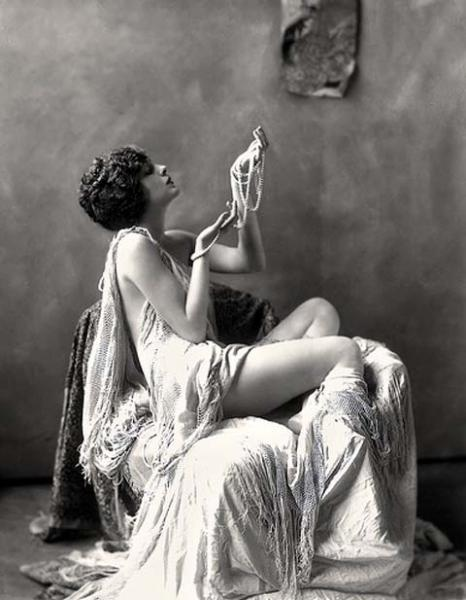
Billie Dove, a Ziegfeld girl

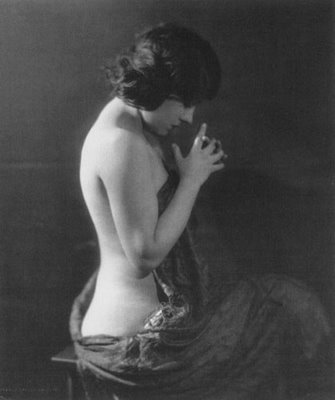
Gloria Swanson

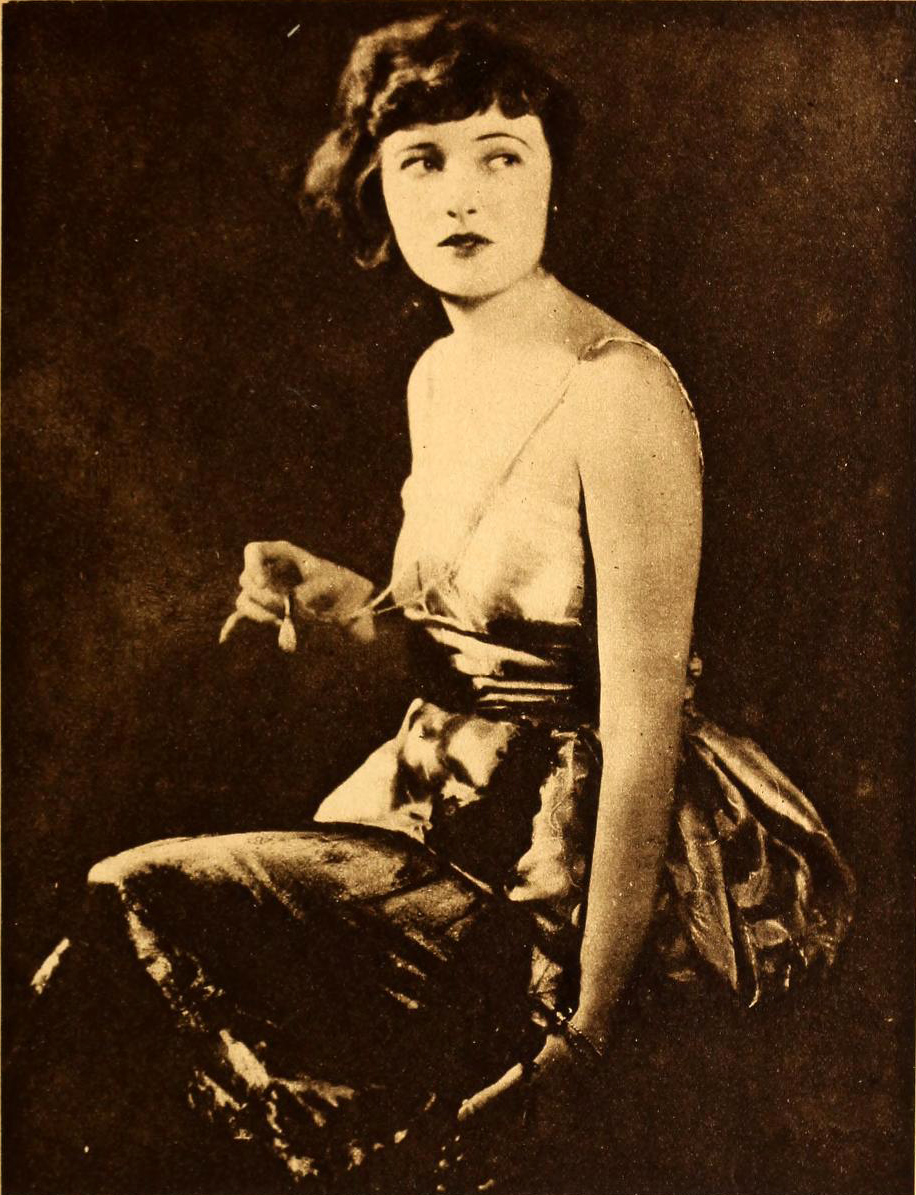
Corinne Griffith

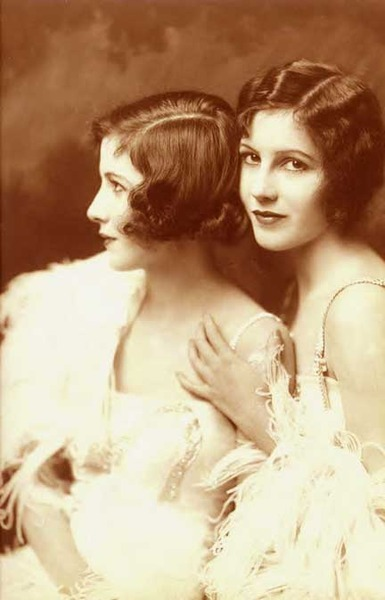
The Fairbanks twins, Madeline and Marion Fairbanks

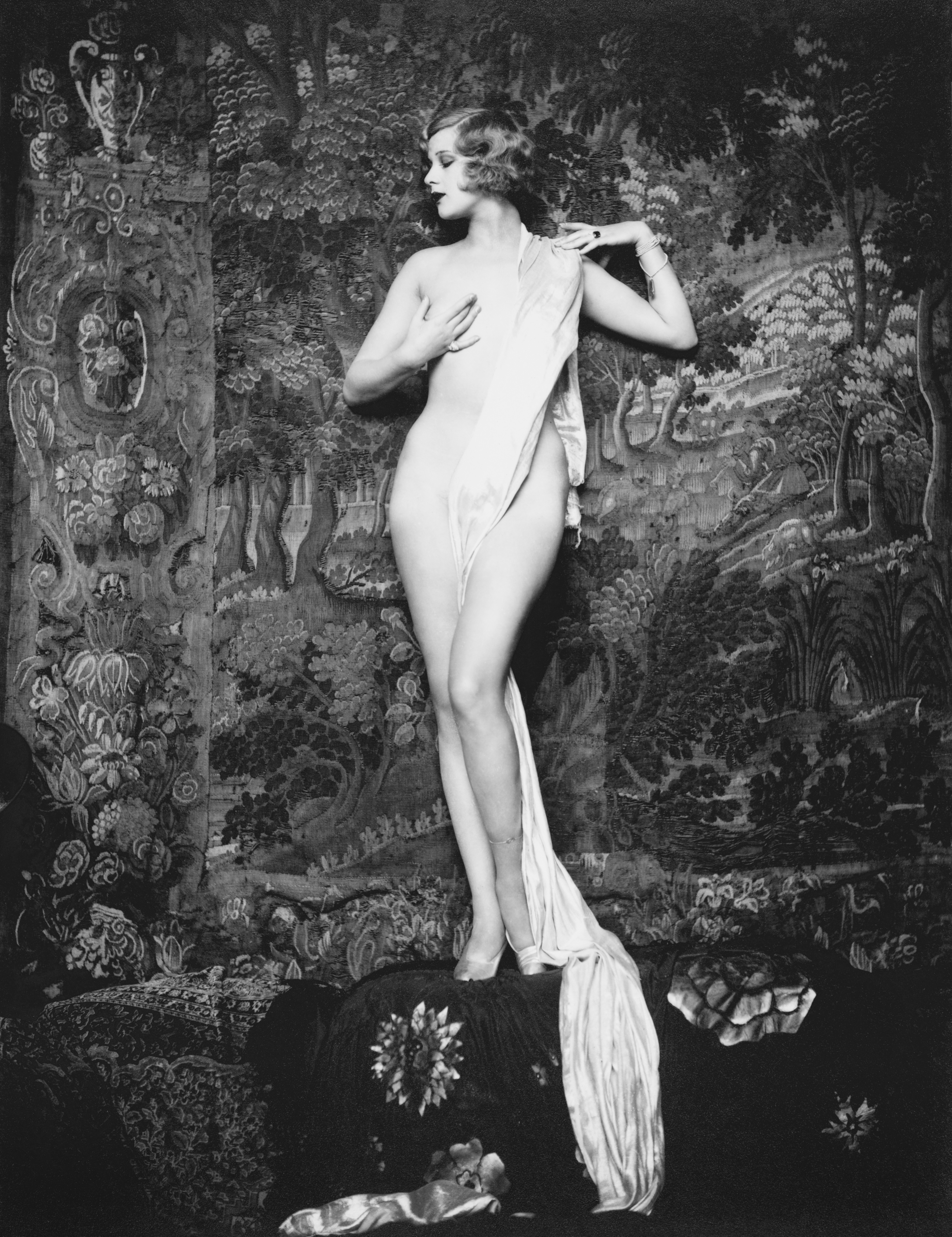
Hazel Forbes, Ziegfeld girl and Miss United States

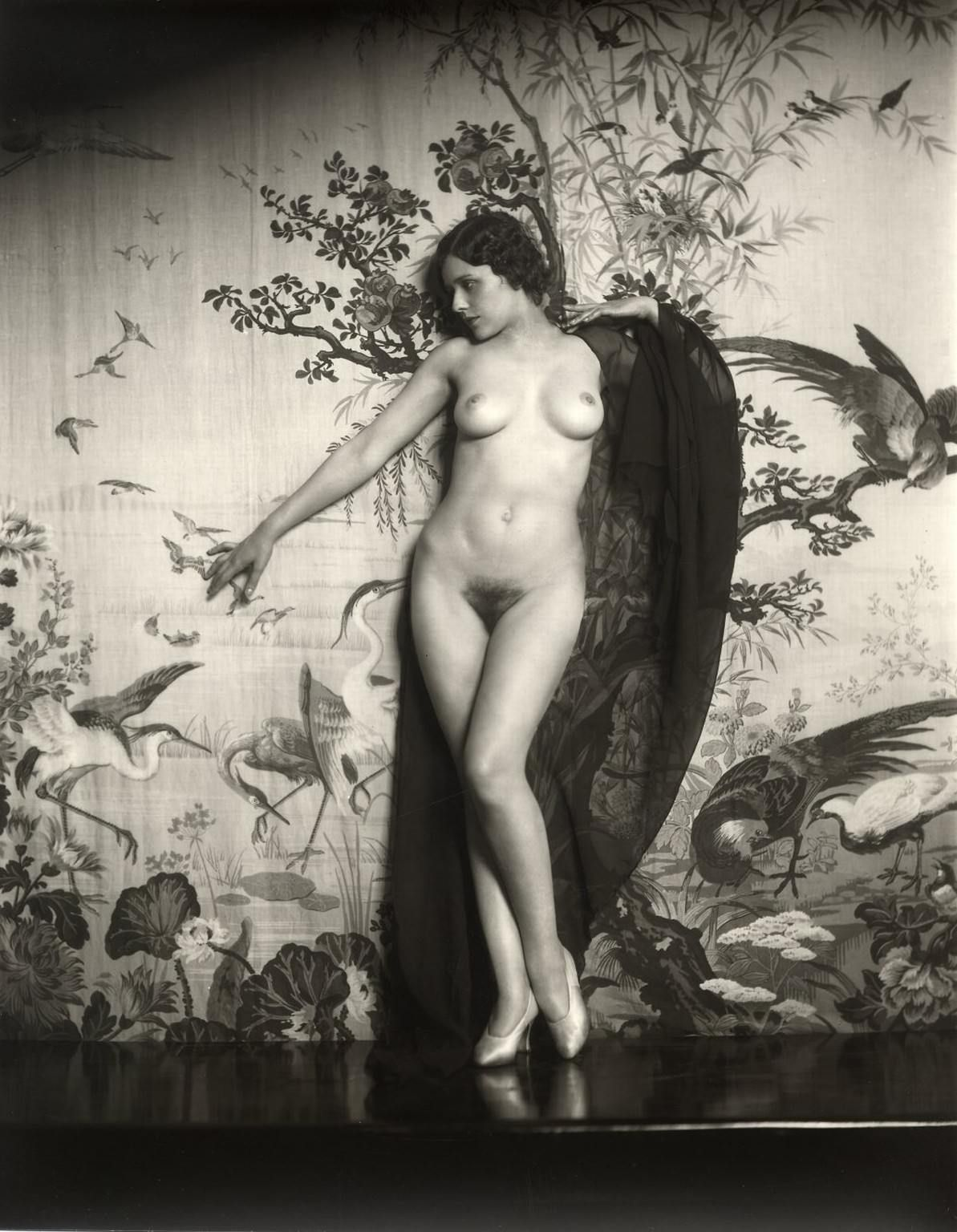
Naomi Johnson, Ziegfeld girl

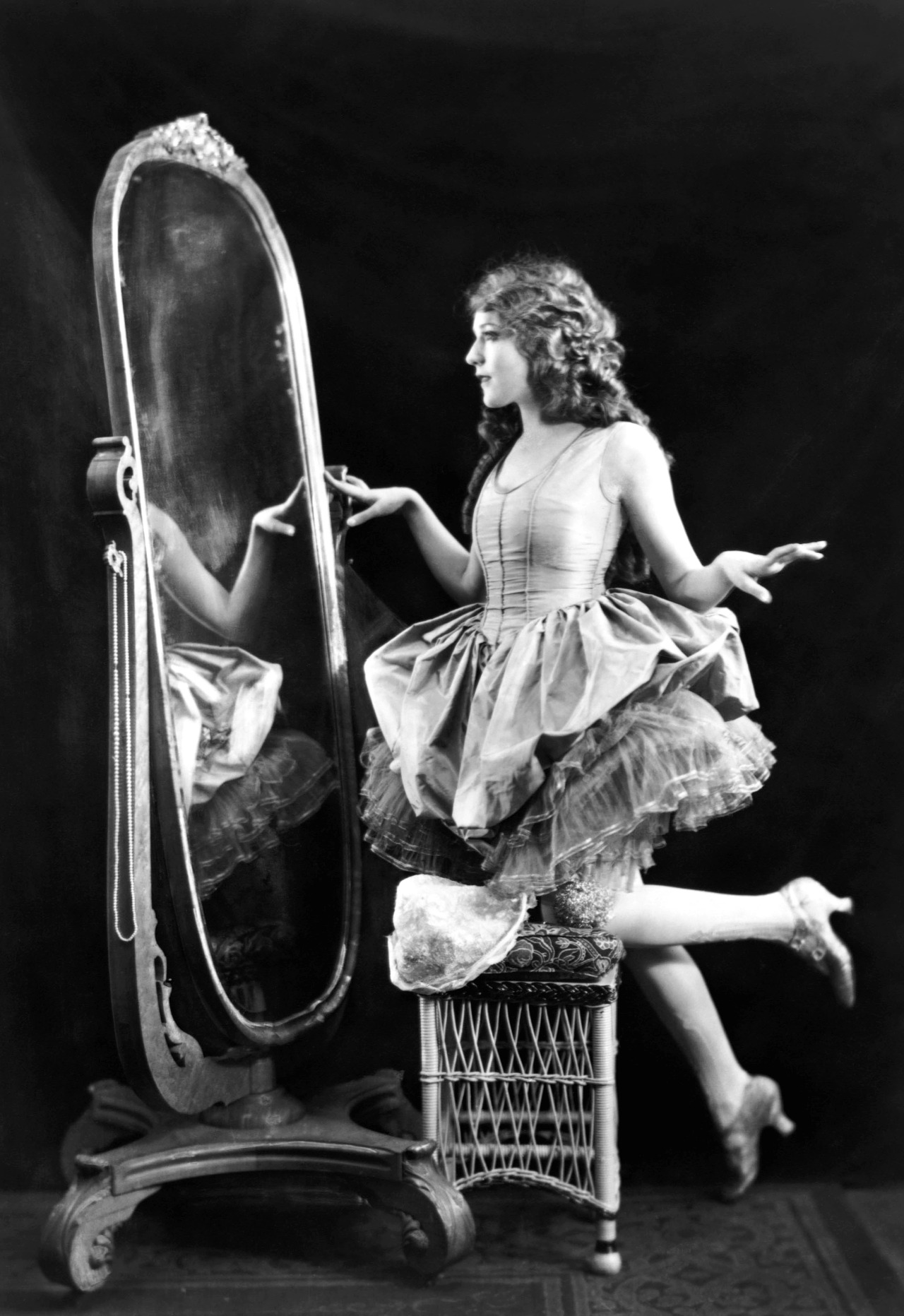
Mary Pickford

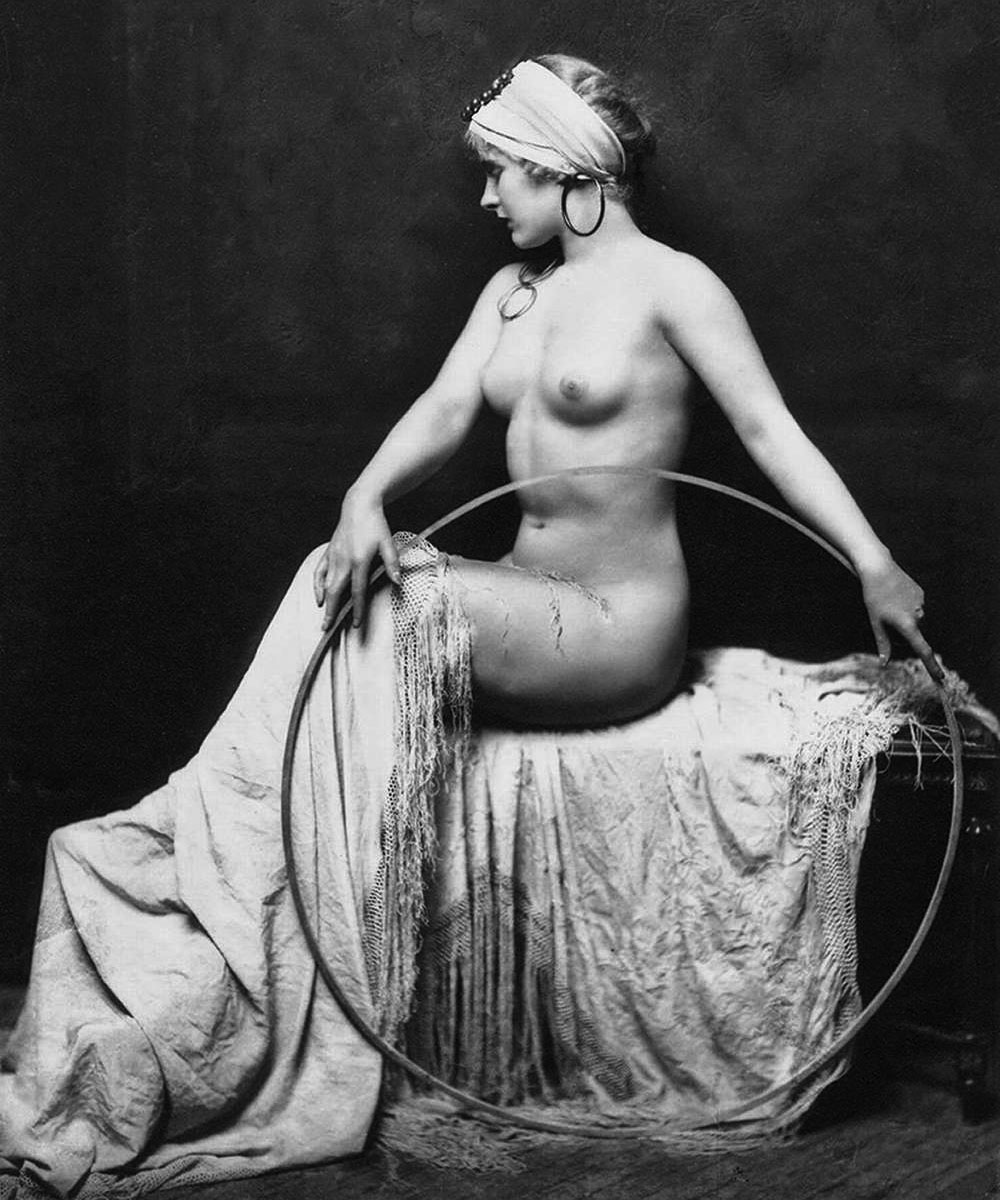
Posing nude woman

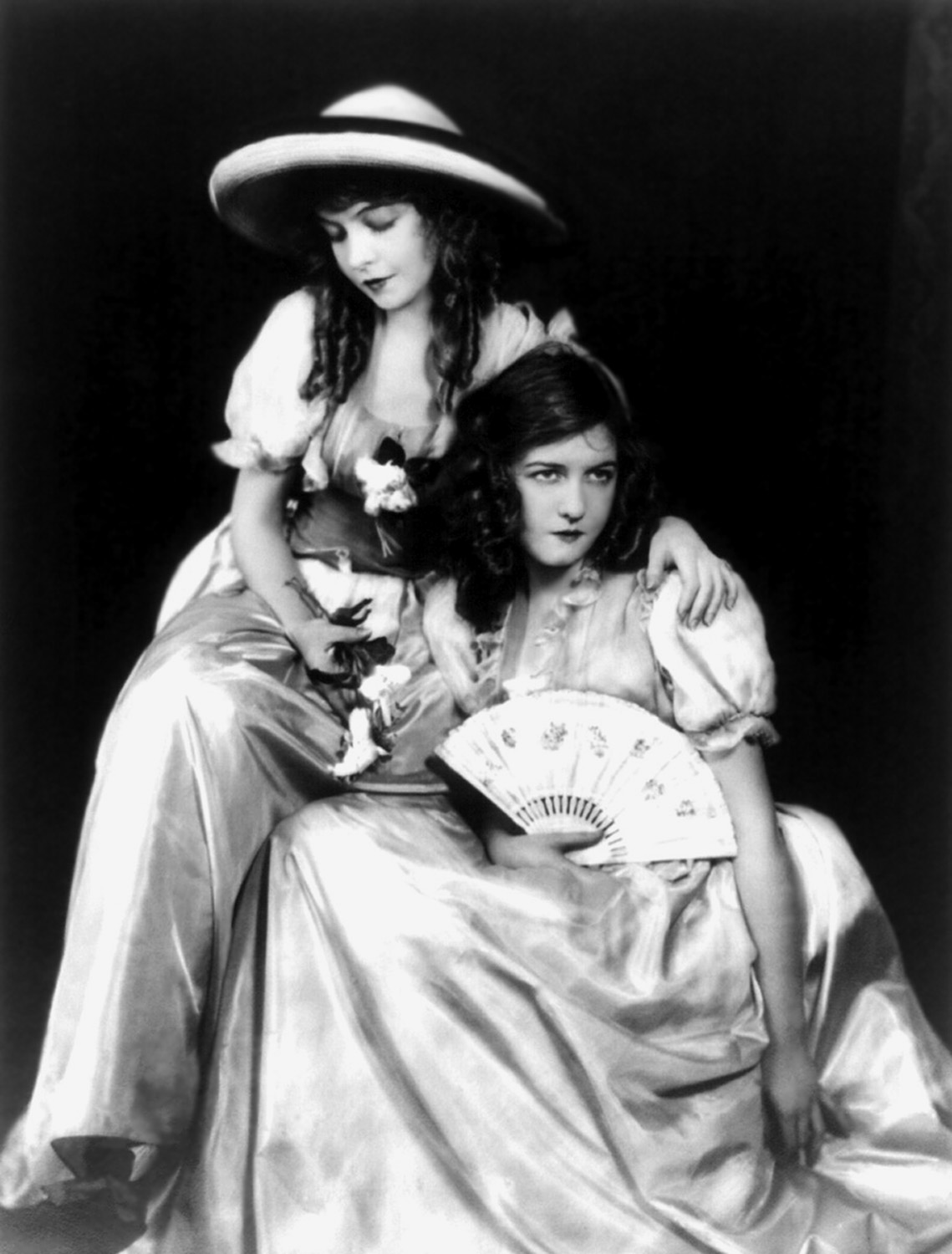
Dorothy and Lillian Gish

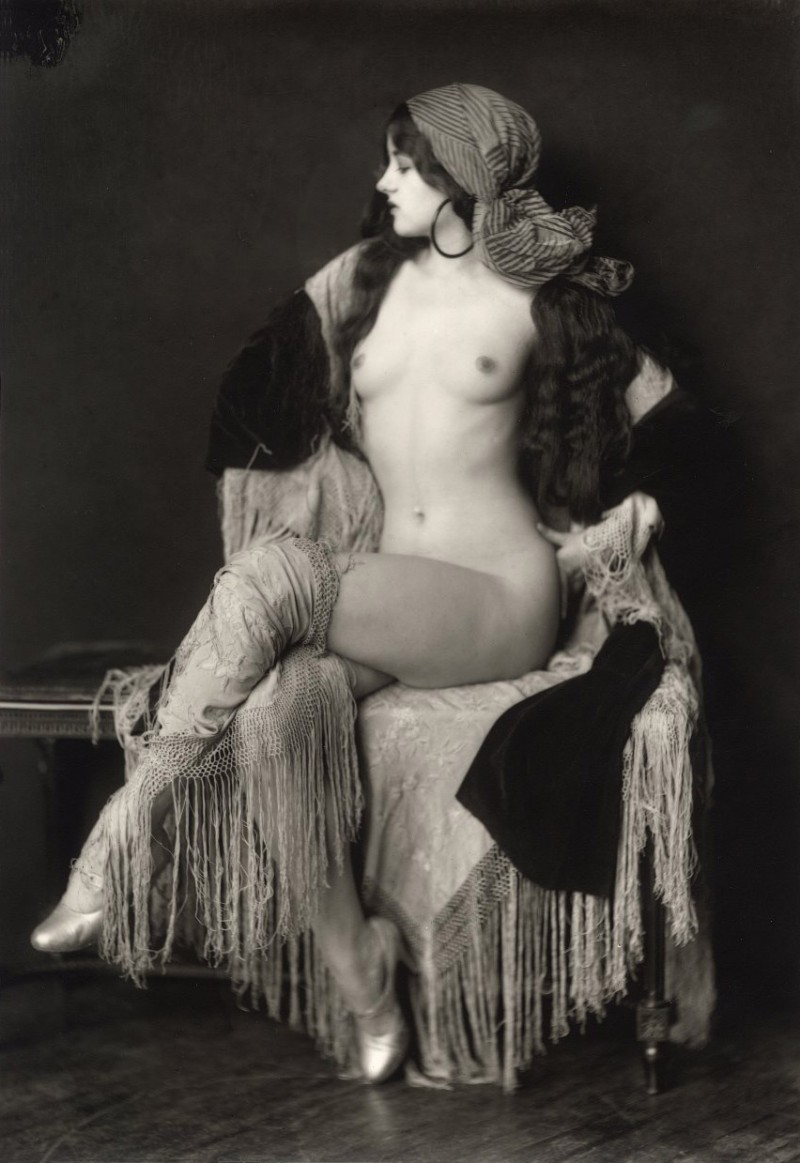
Virginia Biddle

== Bibliography ==
- Enchanting Beauty (New York, NY: Swan Publications Inc., 1937)
- Women of talent and beauty, 1917 to 1930 (48-page illustrated photo-gallery sales catalog, Charles Isaacs Photographs, Malvern, PA, September 1987)

== Sources ==
- Jazz Age Beauties: The Lost Collection of Ziegfeld Photographer Alfred Cheney Johnston, by Robert Hudovernik (New York, NY: Universe Publishing/Rizzoli International Publications, 2006, HB, 272pp.)
