= Haroon Sharif =

Pakistani economist (born 1965)

- ہارون شریف
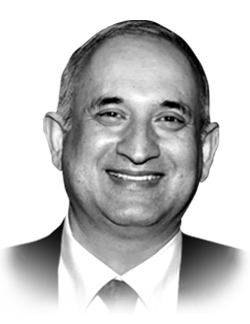

Minister of State and Chairman Board of Investment
- In office September 2018 – June 2019
- President: Arif Alvi
- Prime Minister: Imran Khan
- Preceded by: Naeem Zamindar

Personal details
- Born: 20 February 1965 Pakistan
- Education: London School of Economics University of Hawaii at Manoa Government College University, Lahore
- Occupation: Economist

Haroon Sharif (Urdu: ہارون شریف; born 20 February 1965) is a Pakistani economist who served as the Minister of State and Chairman Board of Investment under Prime Minister Imran Khan from September 2018 to June 2019.

Prior to this, Sharif served as the Regional Advisor to the World Bank Group for South Asia and remained Senior Regional Advisor to the UK's Department for International Development (DFID).

== Early life and education ==
Sharif earned a BA in Economics and Geography from the Government College University, Lahore in 1985. He completed his postgraduate Curriculum in International Business in 1991 from the University of Hawaii at Manoa and MSc in Development Management from the London School of Economics and Political Science in 2000.

== Career ==
On behalf of the Government of Pakistan, Sharif signed the Memorandum of Understanding with China for Industrial Cooperation under the China-Pakistan Economic Corridor. He remained the lead person for Pakistan for the establishment and regulation of Special Economic Zones (SEZs).

Sharif was a member of Economic Coordination Committee of the Cabinet which is the highest forum for economic policy decisions in Pakistan. He was instrumental in developing strategic economic partnerships with Malaysia, Saudi Arabia and Qatar.

Sharif served on the Executive Committee of the World Bank's Consultative Group to Assist the Poor (CGAP) from 2009-2012. He was part of the team that authored CGAP's report Financial Access to the World's Poor.

Sharif is also a fellow of the National Defence University, Pakistan.

== Publications ==
Sharif, Haroon (31 March 2020). "India, Pakistan and the Pandemic: Community of Shared Future?". Jinnah Institute.
