= Naomi =

Naomi or Naomie may refer to:

== People and biblical figures ==
- Naomi (given name), a given name and a list of people with the name
- Naomi (biblical figure), Ruth's mother-in-law in the Old Testament Book of Ruth
- Naomi (Romanian singer) (born 1977), a.k.a. Naomy
- Naomi (wrestler) (born 1987), professional wrestler
- Naomie Harris (born 1976), British actress
- Terra Naomi, American indie folk singer-songwriter

== Arts and entertainment ==
=== Fictional entities ===
- Naomi, a character in the 2009 American fantasy comedy movie 17 Again
- Naomi Bohannon, a character in the TV series Hell on Wheels
- Naomi, Florida, a fictional town in the Kate DiCamillo novel Because of Winn-Dixie

=== Music ===
- Naomi Awards, a former British music award
- Naomi (album), by American band The Cave Singers
- "Naomi" (song), by Neutral Milk Hotel

=== Other uses in arts and entertainment ===
- Naomi (novel), a 1924 novel by Jun'ichirō Tanizaki
- Naomi (comics), a 2019 miniseries published by DC Comics under the Wonder Comics imprint
- Naomi (TV series), a 2022 series based on the comic book series of the same name
- "Naomi" (Skins), episode of British television drama Skins, 2009
- Sega NAOMI, an arcade hardware system

== Places ==
=== United States ===
- Naomi, Georgia, an unincorporated community
- Naomi, Missouri, an unincorporated community
- Naomi, Ohio, an unincorporated community
- Naomi, Pennsylvania, an unincorporated community
- Naomi, South Dakota, an unincorporated community
- Naomi Peak, Utah
- Lake Naomi, Pocono Pines, Pennsylvania
- Site of the Naomi Mine explosion, a 1907 mining disaster in Pennsylvania, United States

=== Other places ===
- Na'ama, an Israeli settlement previously named Na'omi

== Other uses ==
- 6139 Naomi, a main-belt asteroid
- Naomi Institute, a defunct school in Nebraska, United States

== See also ==
- Noemi (disambiguation)
- Naiomi
- Nōami (1397–1471), Japanese painter, poet and art connoisseur
