= Palas Valley =

Palas پالس
- Valley
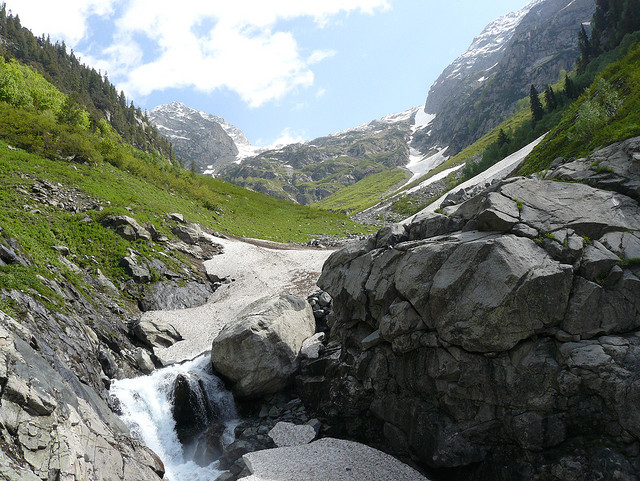
- Palas Valley

- Location within Pakistan
- Coordinates: 35.6°N 73.00°E
- Country: Pakistan
- Province: Khyber Pakhtunkhwa
- District: Kolai-Palas District

Population (2017)
  - Total: 275,461
- Time zone: UTC+5 (PST)

Palas (Urdu: پالس) is a tehsil and valley in Kolai-Palas District, in the Khyber Pakhtunkhwa province of Pakistan.

== Fauna ==
Palas, Kohistan has incredible wildlife, it is home to the largest population of Western tragopan, Kalij pheasant, Koklass pheasant and Himalayan monal occur here, whereas the Cheer pheasant has been reintroduced here. There are 230 bird species in this tehsil. Mammals include carnivores such as the Persian leopard, Himalayan black bear and Red fox. Ungulates such as the Himalayan goral, Himalayan musk deer and wild boar are found here. For the protection of these species 1 national park, 3 wildlife sanctuaries and 5 game reserves have been established. Several surveys on other wildlife have also been compiled by experts including one on musk deer by Naeem Ashraf Raja.
