= Naim Nova =

Albanian actor

- Born: 1 March 1940 (age 85); Kavajë, Albania
- Occupations: Actor; producer; director
- Years active: 1961–present

Naim Nova (born 1 March 1940) is an Albanian actor, director and producer. Throughout his career he has created plays for local comedy theatres in Kavajë, Lushnje, Durrës and Tirana.

== Filmography ==
- Zevendesi i grave (1987)
- Duke kerkuar per 5-oreshin (1974)
