= Naeem Zamindar =

Pakistani business person

Minister of State and Chairman Board of Investment
- In office November 2017 – June 2018
- President: Mamnoon Hussain
- Prime Minister: Shahid Khaqan Abbasi
- Succeeded by: Haroon Sharif

Naeem Zamindar is a Pakistani businessman. He was CEO of Acumen Pakistan from April 2015 to November 2017 and as chairman of Pakistan Board of Investment with the status of Minister of State from November 2017 to June 2018.

== Career ==
He was one of the founding team members of Mobilink where he was head of the company's Broadband Business Division and as CSO.

He became CEO of Wateen in December 2010 and left the office in July 2014.

In April 2015, he became Pakistan Country Director of Acumen where he continued to work until being appointed as chairman of Pakistan Board of Investment (BoI) in November 2017, with the status of Minister of State in the federal cabinet of Prime Minister Shahid Khaqan Abbasi.

During his term as chairman BoI, 75 reforms were completed. He continue to work in the office until resigning in June 2018 for personal reasons.
