= Naomi Johnson =

American showgirl and Ziegfeld Girl (c. 1909–?)

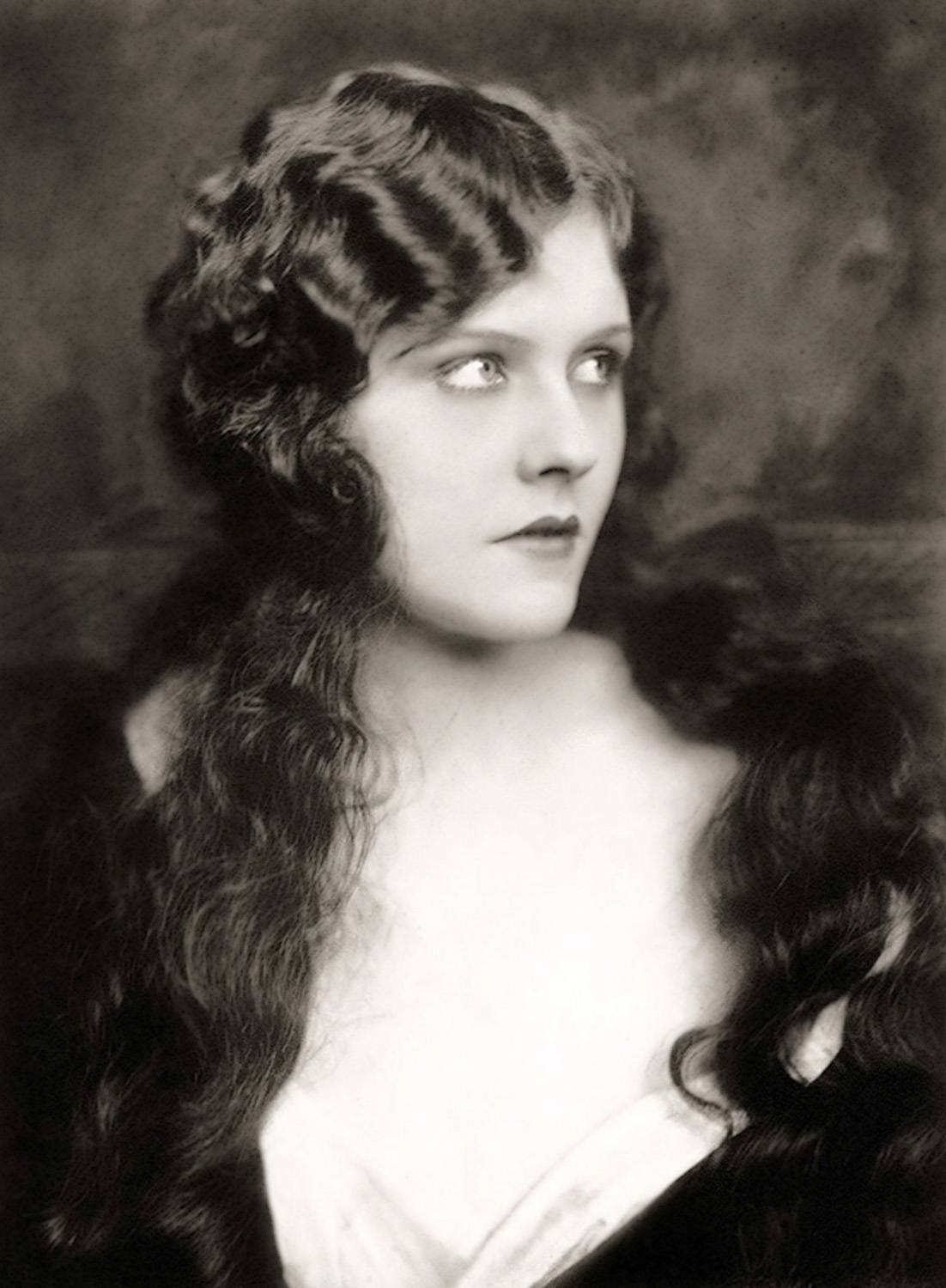
- Johnson c. 1922
- Born: 1909 or 1910; New York City, New York, U.S.
- Occupations: Actress; dancer; showgirl
- Years active: 1922–1930
- Spouse: John Murinelly Cirne (m. 1926)

Naomi Johnson (c. 1909 or 1910 – ?) was an American showgirl and Ziegfeld Girl who performed in Broadway productions during the 1920s and early 1930s. Photographer Alfred Cheney Johnston described her as "the most beautiful of all Ziegfeld's beauties, past or present."

== Early life and career ==
Johnson was born around 1909 in New York City. (Note: The Tatler described Johnson as "barely nineteen" in 1929, suggesting a birth year of 1909 or 1910.) While still in high school, she began working as a model for Ben Ali Haggin, who created the elaborate tableaux for Ziegfeld productions. She made her stage debut at the age of 16, appearing in the Ziegfeld Follies.

== Broadway career ==
Johnson's professional stage career began in 1922 when she played the role of "Ann" in the musical Just Because. That same year, she joined the ensemble of the Ziegfeld Follies of 1922, beginning her association with Florenz Ziegfeld.

Johnson continued to appear in subsequent editions of the Ziegfeld Follies, performing in the ensemble of the Summer Edition of 1923 and both the regular and summer editions of the 1925 Follies.

In 1927, Johnson appeared in the musical Rio Rita, where she performed as one of "The Gringitas" (the Cabaret Girls) and was part of the ensemble. Ziegfeld featured her in two shows simultaneously: she would appear in Rio Rita in the first part of the evening and in Show Boat in the second part. She was not sent on tour.

=== Transition to dramatic roles ===
In 1928, Johnson took on her first significant dramatic role, playing Zoe, the sweetheart of Planchet, in The Three Musketeers at the Lyric Theatre.

In 1928, Johnson left Ziegfeld's organization to join Earl Carroll's productions. Variety reported that she was one of several "Zieggy deserters" who were "wild about Carroll." The publication noted that Johnson was known as the showgirl "with brains" and that Carroll had given her "a more extended speaking part than she had in 'Show Boat.'"

Johnson appeared in The Earl Carroll Vanities in 1928 and her final Broadway appearance was in Artists and Models in 1930, where she played a character named Naomi.

== Photography and legacy ==
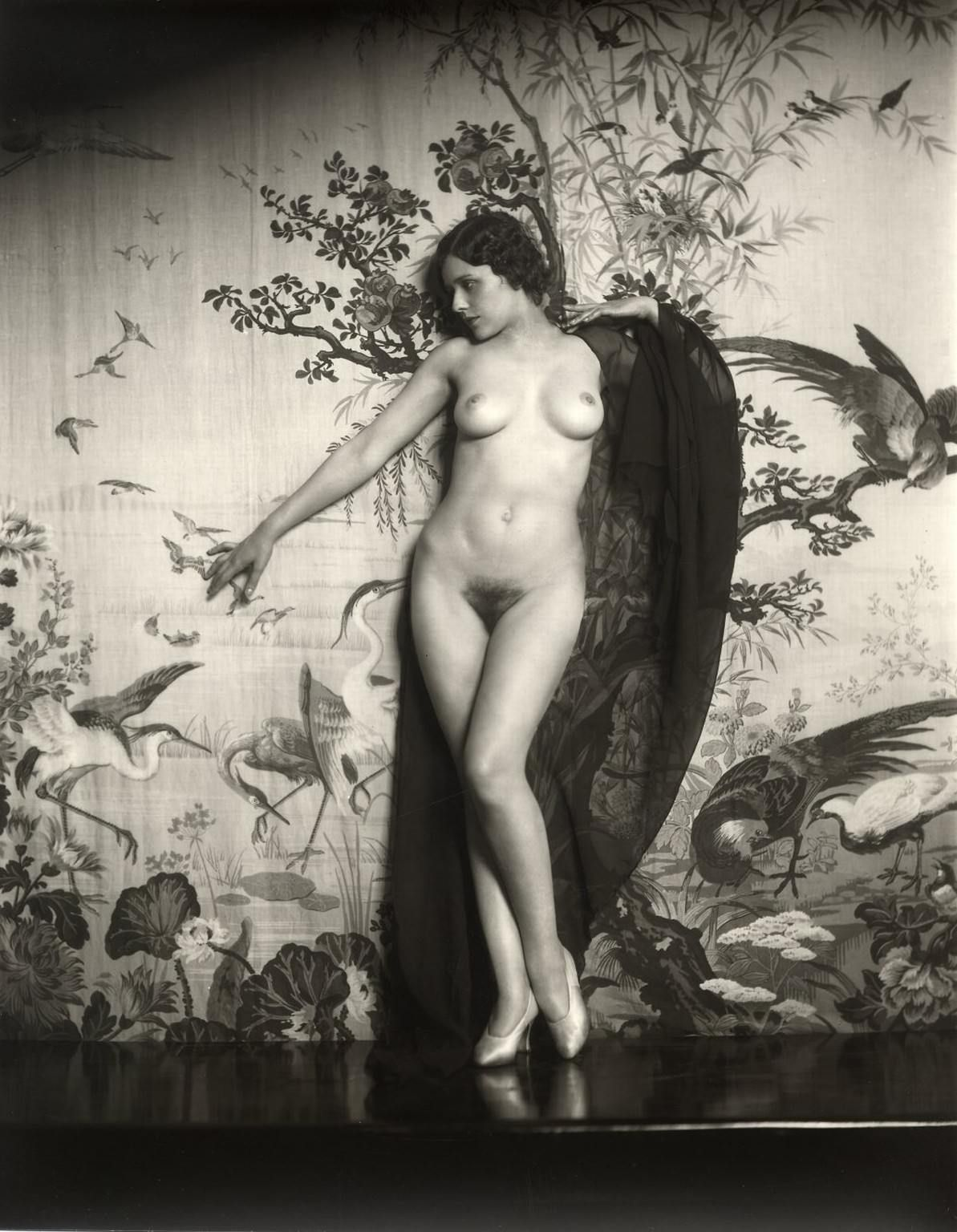
Johnson photographed by Alfred Cheney Johnston in the 1920s

Johnson was extensively photographed by Alfred Cheney Johnston, who was under contract to do all of Ziegfeld's photography. Johnston promoted her as "the most beautiful of all Ziegfeld's beauties, past or present" and created numerous promotional and publicity photographs of her. Some of Johnston's nude photographs of Johnson, discovered after the photographer's death, were not published during the 1920s. The Library of Congress holds photographs of Johnson in Johnston's donated collection. Artist J. Knowles Hare created pastel portrait illustrations of Johnson based on Johnston's photographs.

Johnson's images by Johnston have been featured in modern publications about the Ziegfeld era, including Robert Hudovernik's Jazz Age Beauties: The Lost Collection of Ziegfeld Photographer Alfred Cheney Johnston.

The Tatler profiled Johnson in 1929, noting her dancing, singing, swimming, and golf, and describing her as having "a well-balanced head" and unlikely to be affected by fame.

== Personal life ==
On July 21, 1926, Johnson married John Murinelly Cirne, a foreign delegate to the Sesquicentennial Exposition in Philadelphia, in a ceremony held in New York City.

== Theatre credits ==
Year	Production	Role	Theatre	Notes
1922	Just Because	Ann		
1922	Ziegfeld Follies	Ensemble		
1923	Ziegfeld Follies (Summer Edition)	Ensemble		
1925	Ziegfeld Follies	Ensemble		
1925	Ziegfeld Follies (Summer Edition)	Ensemble		
1927	Rio Rita	One of The Gringitas / Ensemble		
1928	The Three Musketeers	Zoe	Lyric Theatre	
1928	The Earl Carroll Vanities			
1930	Artists and Models	Naomi		
