= Virginia Biddle =

American revue performer and showgirl (1910–2003)

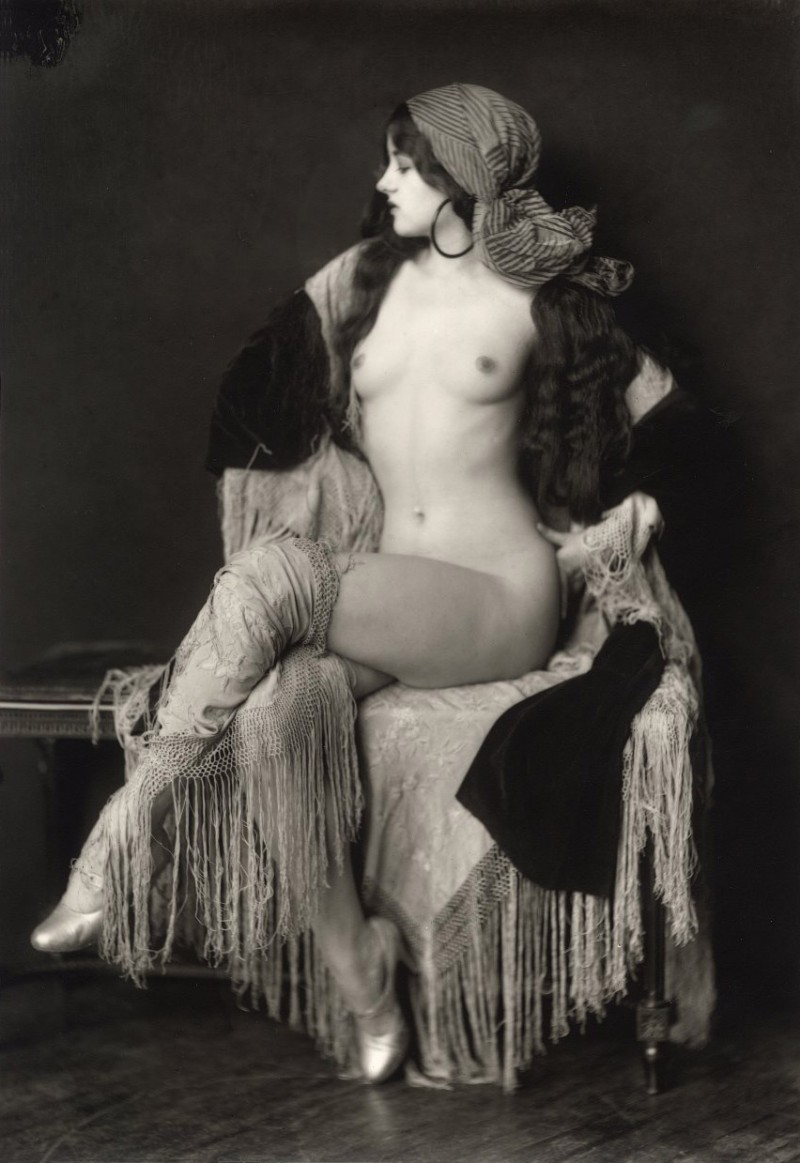
- Biddle in 1927
- Born: December 17, 1910; Topeka, Kansas, U.S.
- Died: February 21, 2003 (aged 92); Old Saybrook, Connecticut, U.S.
- Occupations: Dancer, model, showgirl
- Children: 3

Virginia Biddle (December 17, 1910 – February 21, 2003) was an American revue performer, showgirl, and former nude model. She was a regular performer in Florenz Ziegfeld's Follies shows for several years until 1931.

In July 1931, Biddle sustained burns to her feet and ankles in the explosion of Harry Richman's yacht, the Chavalmar II. Her friend and fellow cast member in the 1931 Follies, Helen Walsh, was killed. Although she played the benefit performance of the Follies in Walsh's memory, Biddle ended her career on the stage in the wake of the accident, and her injuries also forced her to abandon dancing. She sued Richman for $50,000 damages but received only $50.

Later in her life, Biddle married twice, had three children, and worked as a realtor in Old Saybrook, Connecticut. In 2003, she suffered injuries in a car accident and died shortly afterwards.

== Performances ==
- Hot-Cha! (1932)
- Ziegfeld Follies of 1931 (1931)
- Smiles (1930–1931)
- Rio Rita (1927–1928)
