= Naiomi Glasses =

Diné textile artist and skateboarder

- Born: Rock Point, Arizona, U.S.
- Website: naiomiglasses.net

Naiomi Glasses is a Diné textile artist, weaver, skateboarder, and designer. She gained public attention through viral videos of her skateboarding in traditional Diné attire on the Navajo Nation and uses her platform to advocate for increased access to the sport for Indigenous youth. In 2022, she became the inaugural artist-in-residence for the Ralph Lauren Corporation, co-designing a collection that celebrated Indigenous artistry.

== Early life ==
Glasses is from Rock Point, Arizona, on the Navajo Nation. Her parents are Cynthia and Tyler Glasses Sr., and she has a brother, Tyler Glasses Jr. As a child, her family moved from the suburbs of Phoenix to Dinétah when she was 12 years old. Upon returning to the reservation, she and her brother learned the craft of weaving on an upright loom from their paternal grandmother. Their first projects were saddle blankets made with undyed strands for their horse. Glasses also developed a deep appreciation for turquoise jewelry from her grandmother, Nellie, who taught her to wear the stone daily so that the "holy people" would recognize her. She began her own turquoise collection at age 14.

Glasses began skateboarding at age five after seeing her older brother's friend skate. She has a bilateral cleft lip and palate and was bullied as a child. She described skateboarding as a "refuge" and a way to decompress during that time. At her mother's suggestion when she was 18, Glasses wrote down her career goals, which included collaborating with heritage fashion brands. She listed Ralph Lauren at the top of her list.

== Career ==
As a seventh-generation Diné weaver, Glasses considers herself primarily as a weaver. She creates items such as purses, saddle blankets, and rugs.

In 2021, Glasses gained widespread attention after posting videos on TikTok of her skateboarding on smooth, red sandstone formations near her home. The videos, which often feature her skating in traditional Diné clothing and long, vibrant skirts, went viral. Her social media presence led to a feature in Teen Vogue.

Following an internship with the Creative Futures Collective, Glasses collaborated with designer Gabriela Hearst, weaving textiles for Hearst's Spring-Summer 2022 runway collection.

=== Ralph Lauren artist-in-residence ===
Glasses became the inaugural artist-in-residence for Ralph Lauren Corporation, a goal she had set for herself at age 18. The first of three seasonal, limited-edition drops for the Polo Ralph Lauren x Naiomi Glasses collaboration was released on December 5, 2023. The collection incorporated traditional Diné motifs from her work, including the Spider Woman cross, four-directional crosses, and Saltillo diamonds. As part of the residency, Glasses curated a selection of jewelry from seven contemporary Navajo and Hopi artist families, which was featured in the campaign and made available for purchase.

The collection's campaign was shot by an all-Indigenous team, including photographers Ryan Redcorn (Osage) and Darren Sells (Diné), and featured models Quannah Chasinghorse (Hän Gwich'in/Oglala Lakota) and Phillip Bread (Comanche/Kiowa/Blackfeet). A portion of sales from the first collection was designated to benefit Change Labs, a nonprofit organization that supports Navajo and Hopi small businesses.

Glasses and her brother Tyler collaborated with Ralph Lauren Home as its first artists in residence for the home category, co-creating furnishings for the "Canyon Road" collection. The line included items like tableware stamped with Spider Woman crosses.

=== Advocacy ===
Glasses has used her platform to advocate for greater access to skateboarding on Native reservations. She has highlighted the lack of infrastructure, such as skateparks and shops, which often forces residents to travel two to three hours to buy equipment. She has worked with the organization Wonders Around the World and a Navajo-inspired clothing company to build a new skatepark in the Two Grey Hills, Newcomb, New Mexico community of the Navajo Nation. The skatepark is planned to be the community's first outdoor recreational sports facility.

== Personal life ==
Glasses is based in her hometown of Rock Point, Arizona, in the Navajo Nation, where she raises sheep. Her favorite Navajo saying is "T'áá hwó' ají t'éego," which she translates as "it's what you make it" and interprets as a call to be strong, bold, confident, and true to oneself.
