= Naim Talhouk =

Lebanese writer and poet

- Occupation: Writer, poet.
- Language: Arabic
- Genre: Novels; Short Stories; Poetry Diwans
- Subject: Religion; Politics; Social issues; national issues; Lebanon-related topics
- Years active: 2011-now
- Notable works: "Faras al Diwan-Poem": "Lust of Resurrection"; "Because Her Body"; "It is the Last Poem"

Naim Talhouk (Arabic:نعيم تلحوق) is a Lebanese writer and poet that published many poetry diwans, the most famous one might be diwan “Faras Al Ketab-Poem” and diwan “Lust for resurrection”, which was different from diwan “Because her body” that addressed multiple issues concerning women. Then there is diwan “It is the Last Poem” which played a huge role in the poet's popularity on a local level and later in the Arab world.

== Early life and education ==
Naim Talhouk was taught rhetoric by his father ever since he was a child of 10 years old. Then he started reading philosophy when he was 12 years old in conjunction with literature. When he was a young man he started sending some of his articles and transcripts to magazines and newspapers, he also wanted to publish his poems too.

== Career ==
Naim was the executive of editing for a magazine about cultural affairs brought out by the ministry of Lebanese culture. He then published his poetry diwan titled “Faras al Ketab-poem” which was published by Dar Ghawayat for publishing and distribution, and it was 107 pages. He also published his second poetry diwan with the title “Lust of Resurrection” with Dar Al Furat for publishing and distribution and it contained definitions of lust and desire and its existence within oneself, produced by the questioning of poetry meaning to beings.

In this novel Naim tried to state some kind of protest and rebellion in a scene of idiomatic narrative. The diwan consists of three scenes. The first one being “The fall of lust” and it contains existential questioning in the writer's life. The second one “The possibility of getting out”, the writer reminisces on the places he's visited in Europe and reflects like mirrors that reflect the writer's emotions and questions. The last one titles “Dancing on the throne of life” contains a huge portion of his opinions on women, desire, lust, and human emotions. Some of the notable poems from the diwan are “Question”, “Fall”, “Resurrection of lust”, “Lust of resurrection”, “Start of the end”, “Coincidence”, “You”, “Vision”, “Fate”, “Water” and “Friend”.

“Because her body” is another poetry diwan by the Lebanese poet Naim Talhouk published by Dar Fekir for research and publishing and it contained a number of topics regarding women. His most notable work is the poetry diwan “It is the last poem” which was published by the journalism and cultural services office with 113 pages. In which Naim wrote about children, the child with paper dreams and how death does not welcome anyone but it takes them as quick as a flash.

== Opinions ==
Naim Talhouk rejects the idea of “politicizing poetry”, courtesies and favoritism. As well as who he calls “semi-critics” who pose themselves on social media and newspapers. Talhouk describes himself with somewhat consistent uncertainty as someone who is looking for himself and still trying to find himself. Oppositely, Naim sees that the literary movement is going down a crooked path since what he calls semi-writers who are in active relations with the press and social media platforms came up .

Unlike most writers and poets, the COVID-19 epidemic in Lebanon has sheltered Naim in mentally and psychologically. Naim see that a poet is different than the rest of people, rebelling on reality as he tears down obstacles and build his way using poetry. Naim focuses on existence in his writing as he is always trying to answer the big question of the meaning behind existence.

Naim credits his philosophical and mystical journey for inspiring his literary works and opinions. As well as his early readings of Greek, Persian and western literature as they have heavily affected his poetry. Naim Talhouk's favorite poet is Al Mutanabbi, which in his opinion is the greatest modern poet. On the other hand, Naim sees that the genre of the novel is progressing, but it still cannot get ahead of poetry in advancement. As he also feels that the field of literary writing allows one to blend between these two genres of poetry and novels to as he has noticed that there are a considerable number of new novels containing poems.

== Notable Work ==
This is a list of Naim Talhouk's most notable works:

- "Faras al Ketab-poem".
- "Lust of resurrection".
- "Because her body".
- "It is the last poem".
