= Noémi (novel) =

1895 novel by Sabine Baring-Gould

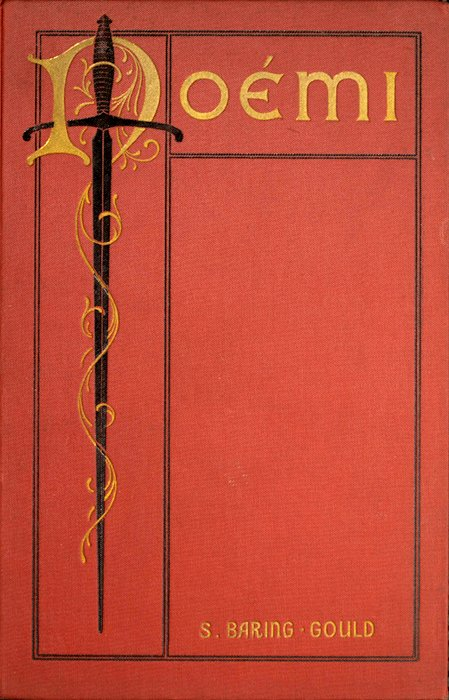
- Cover of the first American edition
- Author: Sabine Baring-Gould
- Genre: Historical fiction
- Published: 1895
- Pages: 368

Noémi: A Story of Rock-dwellers is an historical novel by Sabine Baring-Gould, published in 1895.

== Characters ==
- Le Gros Guillem
- Ogier del' Peyra
- Jean del' Peyra
- Noémi

== Synopsis ==
This is a tale of Aquitaine, during the English occupation, in the early fifteenth century. The country was in a state of civil war; and free companies, nominally fighting for French or English, but in reality for their own pockets, mere plunderers and bandits, flourished mightily. The most dreaded freebooter in the valley of the Dordogne was Le Gros Guillem, who from his stronghold at Domme sweeps down upon the farms and hamlets below; till at length the timid peasants, finding a leader in Ogier del' Peyra, a petty sieur of the neighbourhood, rise up against their scourge, destroy his rocky fastness, and put his men to death or flight. Guillem's daughter, Noémi, a madcap beauty, joins her father's band of ruffians; but soon sickens of their deeds, and risks her life to save Ogier from the oubliette, because she loves his son.

== Appraisal ==
Helen Rex Keller writes, "The book is filled with thrilling and bloody incident, culminating in the storming of L'Eglise Guillem, as the freebooter's den is ironically called, and the strange death of the robber chieftain. The descriptions of the wild valley of the Dordogne, and the life of the outlaws, are striking; and the pretty love story, set against this background, very attractive. As a picture of a fierce and horrible period, it is hardly less vivid than the 'White Company' of Conan Doyle."

== Sources ==
- Bassett, Troy J. (18 August 2022). "Noémi". At the Circulating Library: A Database of Victorian Fiction, 1837–1901. Retrieved 9 November 2022.

Attribution:

- Keller, Helen Rex (1924). "Noémi". In The Reader's Digest of Books. The Library of the World's Best Literature. New York: The Macmillan Company. p. 612.
