= Noémi Orvos-Tóth =

Hungarian psychologist (born 1971)

Noémi Orvos-Tóth (born 1971) is a Hungarian clinical psychologist. She is the founder of the Institute of Transgenerational Trauma, and the author of Inherited Fate, a book about collective historical trauma and transgenerational trauma.

== Life and career ==
Orvos-Toth was born in Hungary in 1971, and moved to Germany with her family in 1987, spending a year in a refugee camp. She returned to Hungary in 1990.

Orvos-Toth graduated in psychology at Eötvös Lóránd University in Budapest and then in clinical psychology at the University of Debrecen. She has worked as a clinical psychologist in hospital settings and in private practice. Orvos-Toth is a proponent of the idea of transgenerational trauma, which theorises that trauma experienced by some members of a group can be passed down to later generations. In 2023 she founded the Institute for Transgenerational Trauma.

Besides her clinical psychology work, Orvos-Toth is also an author. She contributed to a 2017 book about relationships between parents and children, and wrote a popular 2018 book about recovery from emotionally abusive relationships. In 2024, Orvos-Toth appeared on Hrvatska Radiotelevizija in Croatia where she gave an interview and a new book Inherited Fate. The appearance was part of a longer promotion in the country which saw her cover the topic of transgenerational trauma. During the interview, she explained her personal fear of losing her daughter when she was a newborn; Orvos-Toth was then able to trace this fear back to her ancestors who had also lost children. The book Inherited Fate became a best-seller in Hungary, selling 300,000 copies by early 2024. In 2024 it was announced that Cornerstone Press had won an auction for the rights to Inherited Fate, and would publish it in more than 20 languages from 2025. Orvos-Toth is also the co-host of podcast ‘We Need to Talk!’.

In 2023 Orvos-Toth was presented with the Libri Public Favourite Award at the Libri Literary Awards, for the best-selling book of the past sixteen years.
