= Puttin' On the Ritz (film) =

1930 film

- Poster for the 1940s re-release
- Directed by: Edward Sloman
- Written by: James Gleason; William K. Wells; John W. Considine, Jr. (story)
- Produced by: Joseph M. Schenck; John W. Considine Jr.
- Starring: Harry Richman; Joan Bennett; James Gleason
- Cinematography: Ray June
- Edited by: Hal C. Kern; W. Donn Hayes
- Music by: Fred E. Ahlert; Val Burton; Jack Meskill; Sam Messenheimer; Harry Richman; Pete Wendling; Irving Berlin
- Distributed by: United Artists
- Release date: March 1, 1930
- Running time: 88 minutes
- Country: United States
- Language: English

Puttin' On the Ritz is a 1930 American pre-Code musical film directed by Edward Sloman and starring Harry Richman, Joan Bennett, and James Gleason. The screenplay was written by Gleason and William K. Wells based on a story by John W. Considine Jr. It was the first of many films to feature the popular song "Puttin' On the Ritz", which was written and published by Irving Berlin in 1929.

== Plot ==
Harry Raymond and his friend Jim Tierney work as song promoters for a music publisher. Harry pesters his boss to put out a song he's written with showgirl Dolores Fenton and the boss, irritated, fires him. Loyal friend Jim quits his job in solidarity. Harry and Jim then team up with Dolores and her friend Goldie to work up an act. Harry and Dolores become a Broadway sensation with their number "With You". They fall in love and get engaged, but as his fame grows, success goes to Harry's head. He spurns his old friends in favor of socializing with the upper crust. He becomes drunk and snubs Goldie and Jim at a Christmas party. Dolores leaves him. Harry consumes bad liquor and is struck blind. Jim stands by his old friend, but Harry makes him promise not to tell Dolores about his blindness.

Time passes, and Jim persuades Harry to accompany him to the opening of a new musical show starring Dolores. At the curtain call, the audience insists she sing the hit "With You". Midway through the song she falters, and Harry joins in from the audience. He tries to leave quickly after, but Dolores follows, and they are reunited.

== Cast ==
- Harry Richman as Harry Raymond
- Joan Bennett as Dolores Fenton
- James Gleason as James 'Jimmy' Tierney
- Aileen Pringle as Mrs. Teddy Von Rennsler
- Lilyan Tashman as Goldie Devere
- Purnell Pratt as George Barnes
- Richard Tucker as Fenway Brooks
- Eddie Kane as Bob Wagner
- George Irving as Dr. Blair
- Sidney Franklin as Schmidt

== Preservation ==
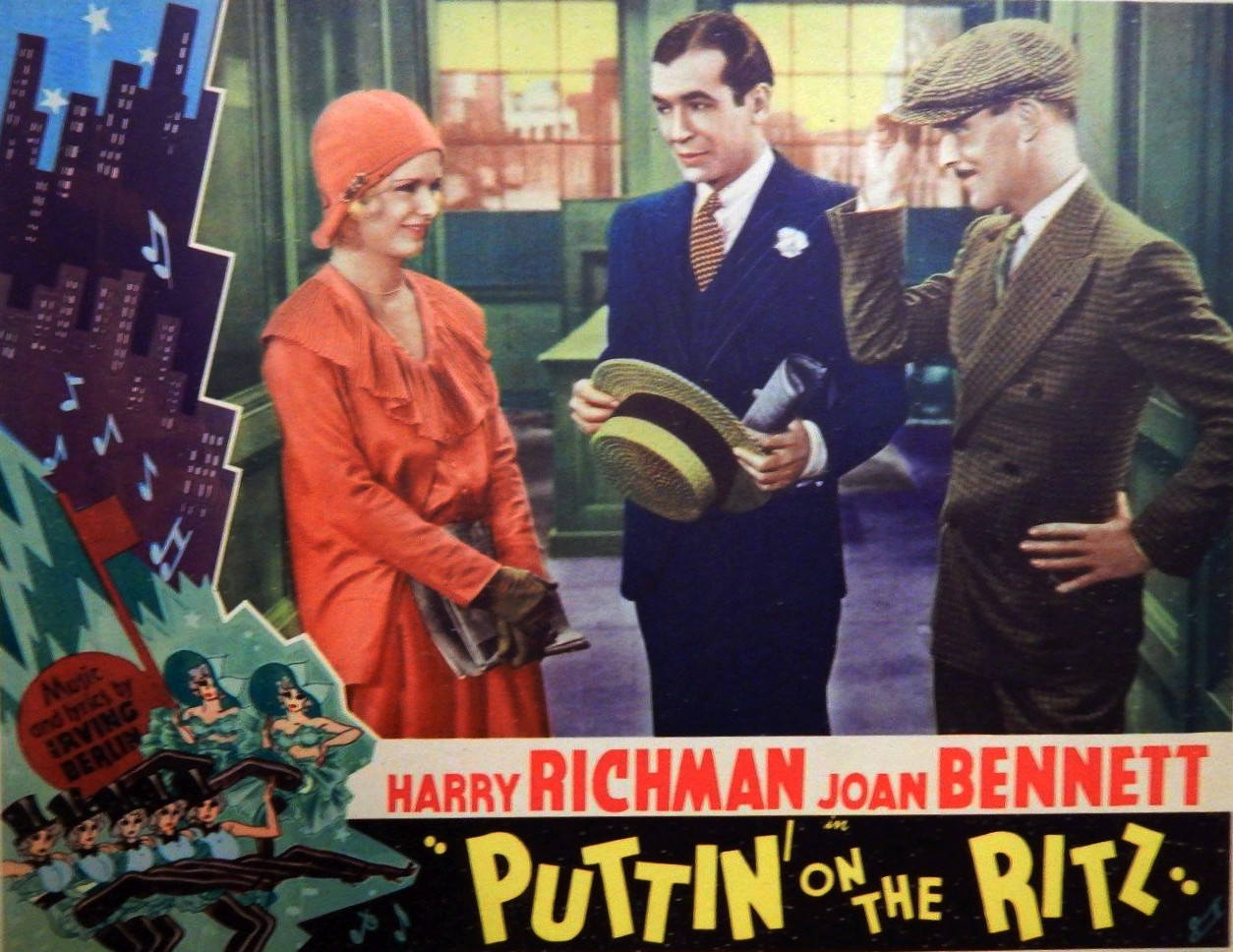
Lobby card

All current prints derive from a 1940s re-release print that was censored for pre-Code content and cut down by about twenty minutes. The title cards at the start and end of the film have also been edited and altered. Puttin' On the Ritz was originally shot with two-color Technicolor sequences, but today those sequences partially survive only in black and white.

== See also ==
- Blue Skies (Fred Astaire film)
- List of early color feature films
