= Naeem Ashraf Raja =

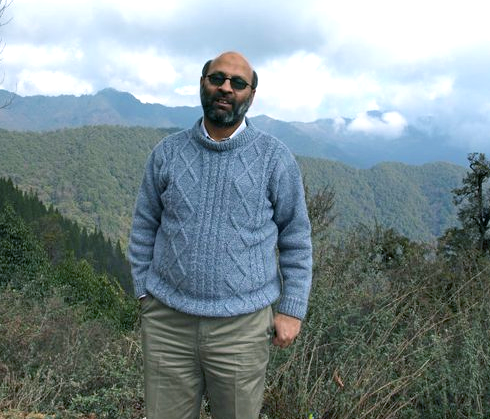
- Born: 1967 (age 58–59)
- Occupations: Director Biodiversity, Pakistan
- Employer(s): Ministry of Climate Change (Pakistan); Government of Pakistan employee as a forester
- Known for: Environmentalist and a conservationist

Naeem Ashraf Raja (Urdu: نعیم اشرف راجہ) is the Director of biodiversity in the Federal Government of Pakistan.

== Career ==
A fellow of 'LEAD Pakistan', Raja previously served as the Assistant Inspector General of Forests in the Ministry of Environment.

Besides his environmental work with the Government of Pakistan, Naeem Ashraf Raja has also worked in the Palas valley with the Himalayan Jungle Project, the Chiltan Markhor Preservation Project, and has also done consultancy work with Pakistan Wildlife Foundation.

Along with his work for the environment, Naeem Ashraf Raja has also published his field research in several venues, presented his research at international conferences and also reviews environment-related submissions for Pakistaniaat: A Journal of Pakistan Studies.

== Environmentalist role ==
Naeem Ashraf Raja often reviews and makes his comments to the Pakistani news media on the dangers to Pakistani forests and biodiversity and in 2014 was also one of the two Pakistani delegates in Geneva to have won a $3.8 million Forest Carbon Partnership Facility Readiness grant for Pakistan.
