= Naeem Sheth =

Zimbabwean cricketer (born 1980)

Personal information
- Born: 25 May 1980 (age 46); Umtali, Manicaland, Zimbabwe
- Batting: Right-handed
- Bowling: Right-arm off break

Domestic team information
- Years: Team
- 2001/02: Manicaland

Career statistics
Competition	FC
Matches	1
Runs scored	41
Batting average	20.50
100s/50s	0/0
Top score	40
Balls bowled	24
Wickets	0
Bowling average	–
5 wickets in innings	–
10 wickets in match	–
Best bowling	–
Catches/stumpings	0/–
- Source: ESPNcricinfo, 14 July 2021

Naeem Sheth (born 25 May 1980) is a former Zimbabwean cricketer. Born in Umtali (now Mutare), he played one first-class match for Manicaland during the 2001–02 Logan Cup.
