= Naeem Akhtar =

Naeem Akhtar may refer to:

== People ==
- Naeem Akhtar (cricketer) (born 1967), former Pakistani cricketer
- Naeem Akhtar (field hockey) (born 1961), Pakistani field hockey player
- Naeem Akhtar (politician) (born 1952), Indian politician and a cabinet minister in Jammu and Kashmir government
- Naeem Akhtar Afghan (born 1963), Pakistani jurist
