= Harry Richman =

American actor, dancer, singer (1895–1972)

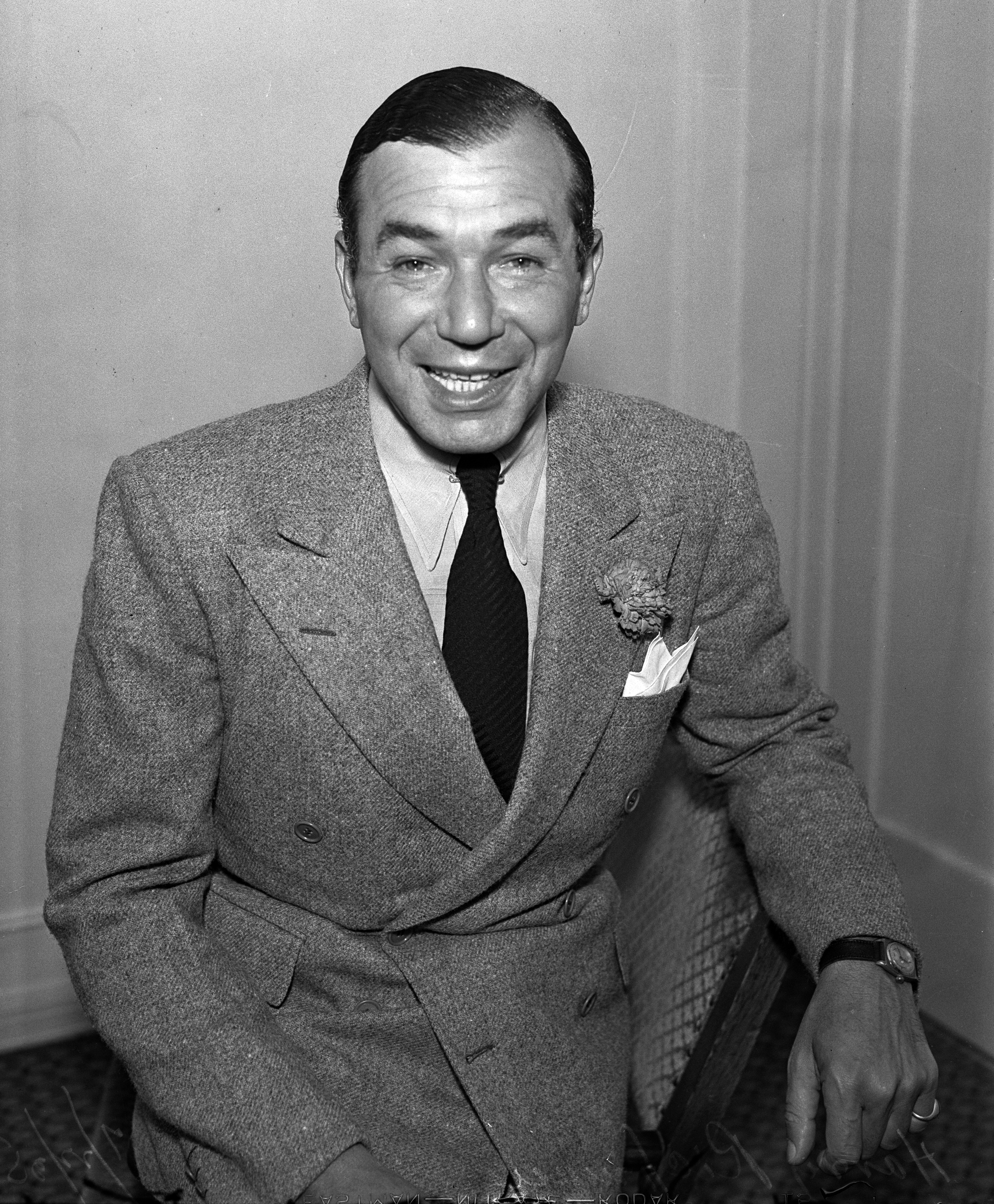
- Richman in 1935
- Born: Henry Reichman Jr. August 10, 1895; Cincinnati, Ohio, U.S.
- Died: November 3, 1972 (aged 77); Hollywood, California, U.S.
- Resting place: Hillside Memorial Park Cemetery
- Occupations: Actor; dancer; singer; comedian; pianist; songwriter; bandleader; nightclub performer; aviator
- Years active: 1913–1956
- Political party: Democratic
- Spouses: Melvina Stephenson (m. 1917; div. 1920) Hazel Forbes (m. 1938; div. 1942) Yvonne Day (m. 1943; div. 1957)

Harry Richman (born Henry Reichman Jr.; August 10, 1895 – November 3, 1972) was an American singer, actor, dancer, comedian, pianist, songwriter, bandleader, and nightclub performer, at his most popular in the 1920s and 1930s. In his peak years, he was one of the highest‐paid performers in show business.

== Early life ==
Richman was born in Cincinnati, Ohio, to Russian Jewish parents Henry and Katie (née Golder) Reichman. His father died when he was 14 years old.

== Career ==
Richman began playing piano in a Cincinnati saloon at age 10. At 18, he changed his name to "Harry Richman", by which time he was already a professional entertainer in vaudeville. He claimed to be making $25,000 a week in 1931 ($415,000 in 2018 dollars) He also owned a popular night club – a Speakeasy, "Club Richman", which was located next to Carnegie Hall. The room was large, seating 240 people. It was designed to look like a patio with fake windows that opened out to scenes painted in the windows. The roof was painted with stars to reflect the spotlight on the performers. It was a popular location till it burned down in 1929.

Eventually known for his nasal baritone, he started out and worked as a piano accompanist to such stars as Mae West and Nora Bayes. With Bayes' act, he made his Broadway debut in 1922. He appeared in several editions of the George White's Scandals in the 1920s to acclaim. Becoming a name, he appeared in "Scandals" as master of ceremonies in 1926; where on opening night the first seven rows of the orchestra commanded $50 a seat ($700 in 2018 dollars). He appeared in the 1931 Ziegfeld Follies.

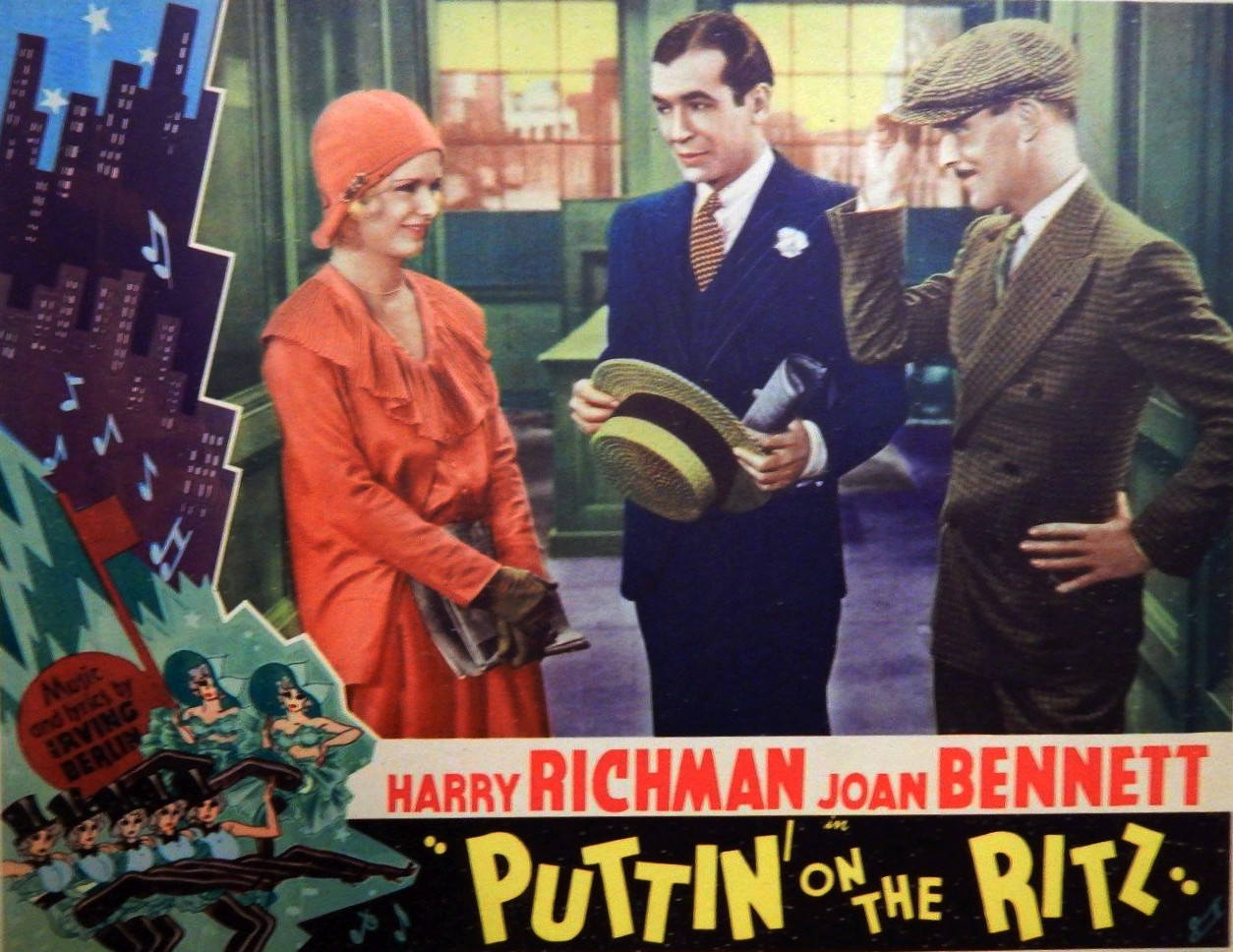
Lobby card for Puttin' On the Ritz (1930)

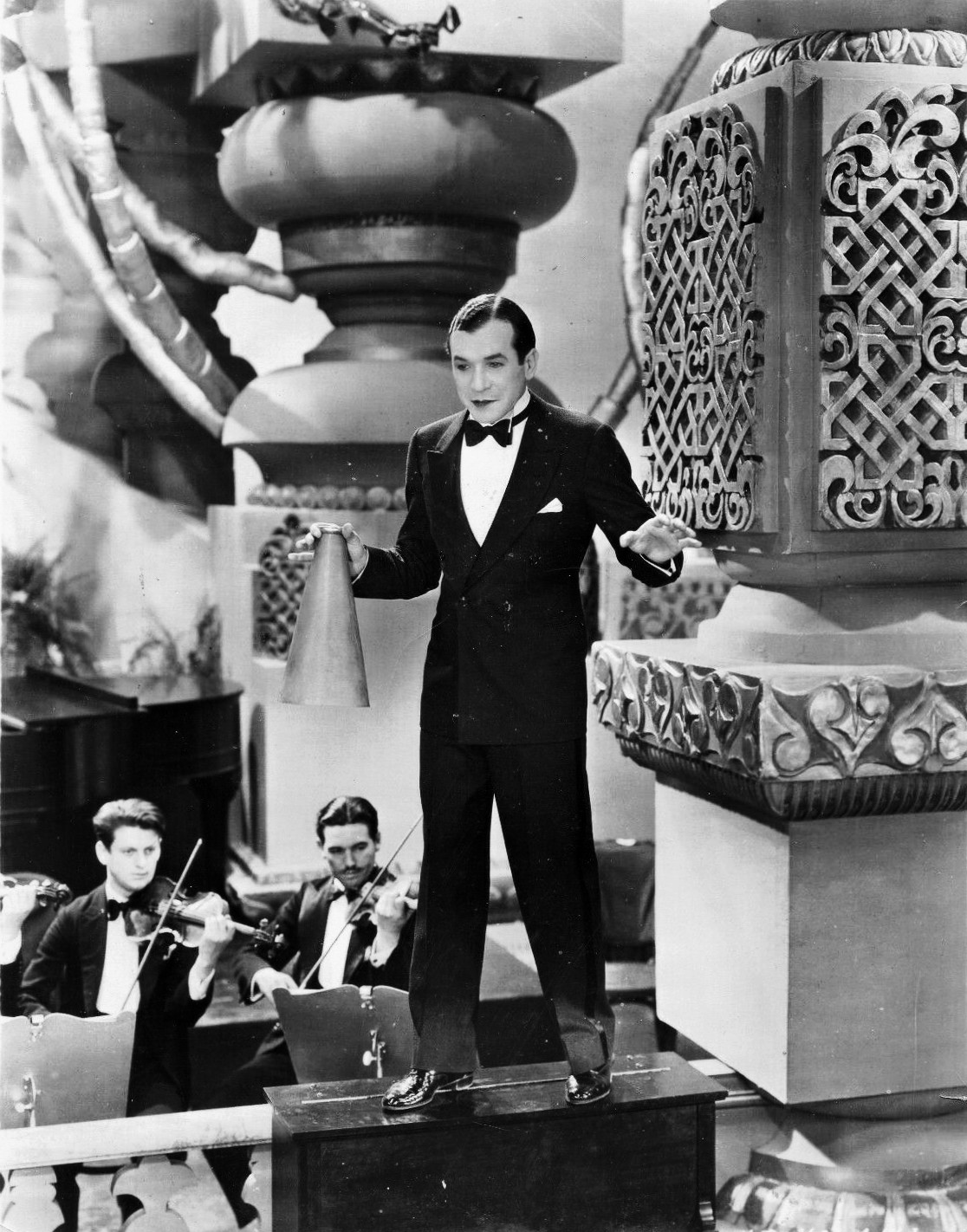
Richman in Puttin' On the Ritz (1930)

He made his feature movie debut in Hollywood in 1930 with the film Puttin' On the Ritz, featuring the Irving Berlin song of the same title, which gave Richman a phonograph record hit that year. His film career was short-lived due to his somewhat overpowering personality, and his limited acting skills. This made little difference to his career; he remained a popular nightclub host and stage performer.

Leonard Maltin is widely quoted as having written of Puttin' On the Ritz: "A songwriter drinks and goes blind – after seeing this you'll want to do the same". In fact, the actual quote is "Famed nightclub entertainer Richman made his film debut in this primitive early talkie about vaudevillian who can't handle success and turns to drink. You may do the same after watching Richman's performance – though he does introduce the title song by Irving Berlin."

Richman had a residence near the end of his career at the Latin Quarter club in Boston, MA, where he performed on Sundays in late 1941.

Richman largely retired in the 1940s, although he made sporadic appearances, including on television, into the 1950s. In 1966, Richman released his memoirs, A Hell of a Life.

== Personal life ==
=== Marriages ===
Richman was married three times and had no children. His first marriage was to Melvina Stephenson, whom he married in 1917. After divorcing Stephenson, Richard married showgirl Hazel Forbes in March 1938, in Palm Springs, California. He and Forbes shared a sumptuous home in Beechhurst, Long Island before divorcing in 1942. Richman married for the third and final time in 1943 to Yvonne Day. That marriage also ended in divorce.

=== Political views ===
Richman was a Democrat and sang "God Bless America" at the 1940 Democratic National Convention held in Chicago.

=== Hobbies and adventures ===
Richman enjoyed sailing, but his yacht Chevalier II exploded in July 1931, killing one person.

Richman was also an amateur aviator of some accomplishment and in 1936 was the copilot, with famed flyer Henry Tindall "Dick" Merrill, of the first round-trip transatlantic flight in his own single-engine Vultee V-1AD transport, named The Lady Peace. Richman had filled much of the empty space of the aircraft with ping-pong balls as a flotation aid in case they were forced down in the Atlantic Ocean. They were forced to land in Wales in 18 hours and 38 minutes. The publicity enabled Richman to sell autographed ping-pong balls until his death, specimens of which continue to appear for sale on celebrity memorabilia websites. The only surviving Vultee V-1, of which only 25 were built, similar to Richman's, is in the Shannon Air Museum in Fredericksburg, Virginia.

== Later years and death ==
Richman spent most of his fortune lavishly, and in his final years, he was impoverished. He suffered a string of illnesses over the years before his death. On November 3, 1972, Richman died in Hollywood, California at the age of 77. He is buried in Hillside Memorial Park Cemetery in Culver City, California.
