= Noemí Rial =

Argentine lawyer and politician (1947–2019)

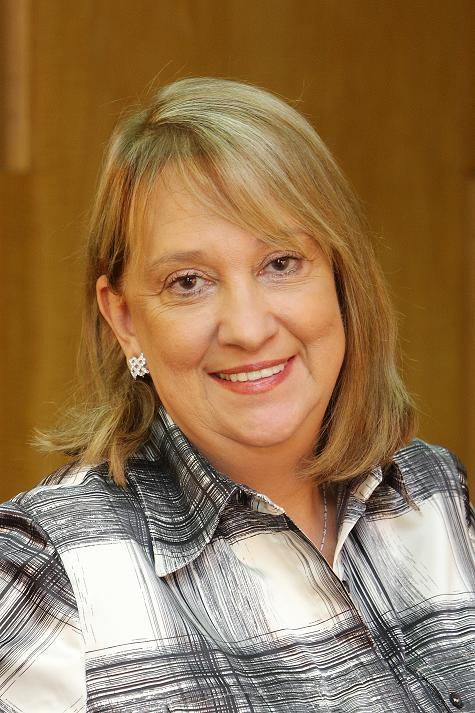

Secretary of Labour
- In office 15 May 2002 – 10 December 2015
- Minister: Graciela Camaño; Carlos Tomada
- Preceded by: Carlos Tomada
- Succeeded by: Ezequiel Sabor

Personal details
- Born: 25 April 1947 Buenos Aires, Argentina
- Died: 24 November 2019 (aged 72)
- Party: Justicialist Party
- Other political affiliations: Front for Victory (2003–2017)
- Profession: Lawyer, politician

Noemí Rial (Spanish pronunciation: [noeˈmi ˈrjal]; 28 April 1947 – 24 November 2019) was an Argentine lawyer and politician who was Secretary of Labour and Vice Minister of Labour, Employment and Social Security from 2002 to 2015. She was appointed by former President Eduardo Duhalde (2002–2003) and confirmed by presidents Néstor Kirchner (2003–2007) and Cristina Fernández, elected in 2007.

She died on 24 November 2019, aged 72, after a long illness.

== Early years ==
Noemí Rial was born to a family of Spanish immigrants that arrived in Buenos Aires at the beginning of the 20th century. Her father, Antonio Rial was an usher at the Teatro Astral. He was also a member of Argentina's Socialist Party (PS). However, in the ‘40s he quit the Party because he believed that it no longer stood for the actual interests of Argentine workers. Her mother, Áurea García, owned a haberdashery and firmly believed in learning as the only way to social ascent.

Noemí was born in Buenos Aires, some blocks away from the Argentine National Congress, and spent most of her childhood in the neighborhood. She went to Normal School Nr. 9, “Domingo Faustino Sarmiento”, where she became a normal teacher. At the time, she wanted to be a doctor. However, she finally decided to study in Law School.

== Law School ==
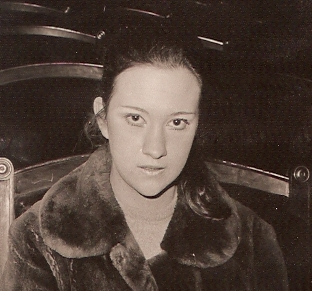
Noemí Rial at her swear-in ceremony as lawyer (1972)

During the 60’s, Noemí entered the Universidad de Buenos Aires (UBA) Law School, and by the end of her studies, she made a thesis on abortion in the Argentine Penal Code. The 70’s marked the beginning of her interest in politics, as she became a member of Argentina’s Juventud Peronista.

In 1972 she became a lawyer and took a teaching position at the Political Law Department, with professors Hernández and Sinigaglia. Two years later, the Department was intervened and its teachers, removed. In March 1976, Hernández y Sinigaglia became two more victims of forced disappearance in Argentina.

== Professional Activity ==
During the military dictatorship, Noemí worked as a full-time lawyer, defending individual workers as well as unions. Soon after democracy returned to Argentina, Noemí resumed teaching at the Department of Labor and Social Security of the University of Buenos Aires Law School, where she has been working for the last twenty years. Since then, she has also taught at different post-graduate schools, not only in Argentina, but also in foreign countries.

From 1991 to 1993 Noemí Rial was appointed head of the Legal Department of the Argentine National Administration of Health Insurances (ANSAL). Later on, she also worked as an advisor of former Congressman Roberto Digón, at the Labor Commission of the Argentine Chamber of Deputies. Digón was one of the main opponents to work flexibilization legislation.

== Human Rights ==
On 27 April 1979 ‘The 25’, a group of young trade union leaders that sought to change Argentine trade unionism, called for the first general strike against the Argentine military government National Reorganization Process.

The military government’s response was brutal: all trade union leaders involved in the strike were sent to prison. Roberto García, from the taxi driver's union, Roberto Digón from the tobacco employees union and Raúl Ravitti from the Unión Ferroviaria were among those imprisoned.

== International Activities ==
By the mid ‘90s, Noemí Rial became the first Argentine woman lawyer of the Argentine General Confederation of Labour (CGT). In 1995 she was chosen representative for the worker's group at the International Labour Organization (ILO), a post she held until 2002. From then on, she has been one of ILO's government representatives.

Noemí Rial has also been president of ILO’s Committee on the Application of Conventions and Recommendations, and she has had an important role in promoting the re-election of Juan Somavía (2008), the first ILO General Director of South-American origin, and also a supporter of labor as a means of social integration and of social democratic values promotion in South America.

== Public activity ==
In May 2002, Noemí Rial was called by Argentine Labor Minister Graciela Camaño to be her Labor Secretary. Thus, she became the first Argentine woman to hold this position

In the midst of Argentina’s worst financial and socio-economic crisis, with unemployment rates of up to 22%, both women helped the Duhalde administration implement the largest social contingency plan ever set up by a South American country: the Jefes y Jefas de Hogar Program, reaching more than two million persons.

From 2003 to 2015 she worked alongside Carlos Tomada at Argentina’s Ministry of Labor, Employment and Social Security.

From then on, the main aim of the administration has been the recovery of labor as a central value to generate social inclusion and an active citizenship.

To that end, Noemí Rial has had a key role in re-instating collective bargaining as a leading tool for social dialogue, salary negotiation and labor quality.

Thus, from a negligible quantity of collective agreements ratified by Argentina’s Labor Ministry, as of 2008 there were more than 1.500.

== Politics ==
In May 2009, Noemí Rial became a candidate to the Argentine Chamber of Deputies for the Frente para la Victoria.

== Bibliography ==
- “La Negociación Colectiva en el Sector Público”, in Revista Derecho del Trabajo, La Ley, Buenos Aires, julio de 1986.
- Normativa Procesal en el Derecho del Trabajo, Editorial Gizeh, Buenos Aires 1987.
- Normativa Procesal en el Derecho del Trabajo, Editorial Gizeh, Buenos Aires 1987.
- Nueva Legislación de Convenciones Colectivas de Trabajo, Editorial Gizeh, Buenos Aires 1988.
- (Co-authorship) “Agenda en cuestiones laborales en 1989”, ENCUENTROS Magazine, FUNDETRA, Buenos Aires 1989.
- Regulación del Trabajo de la Mujer en América Latina, Capítulo “Regulación del Trabajo de la mujer en la República Argentina: Empleo, condiciones de trabajo y normas protectoras”, Organización Internacional del Trabajo (OIT), Ginebra 1992.
- Relaciones Laborales en las PYMES ―Comentarios al Título III de la Ley 24.467―, Sección VIII Mantenimiento y Regulación del Empleo: Tema “Nuevos instrumentos de los trabajadores frente al mantenimiento y regulación del empleo”, Edición del MTSS, Buenos Aires 1995.
- Integración del Mercosur Visión de la Mujer, Capítulo “Algunas sobre la Integración Económica y la Participación de la mujer Trabajadora”, Fundación de Estudios Políticos, Económicos y Sociales para la Nueva Argentina - F.E.P.E.S.N.A., Buenos Aires 1995.
- Derecho Colectivo del Trabajo, Capítulo “Negociación Colectiva en el Sector Público”, La Ley, Buenos Aires 1998.
- (Co-autora) Estado Argentino - Transformación de las relaciones laborales, UTF -Fundación Unión, Buenos Aires 1999.
- Derecho Colectivo del Trabajo, Capítulo “El ejercicio del derecho de huelga. La regulación actual”, La Ley, Buenos Aires 2002.
