= Naomi (given name) =

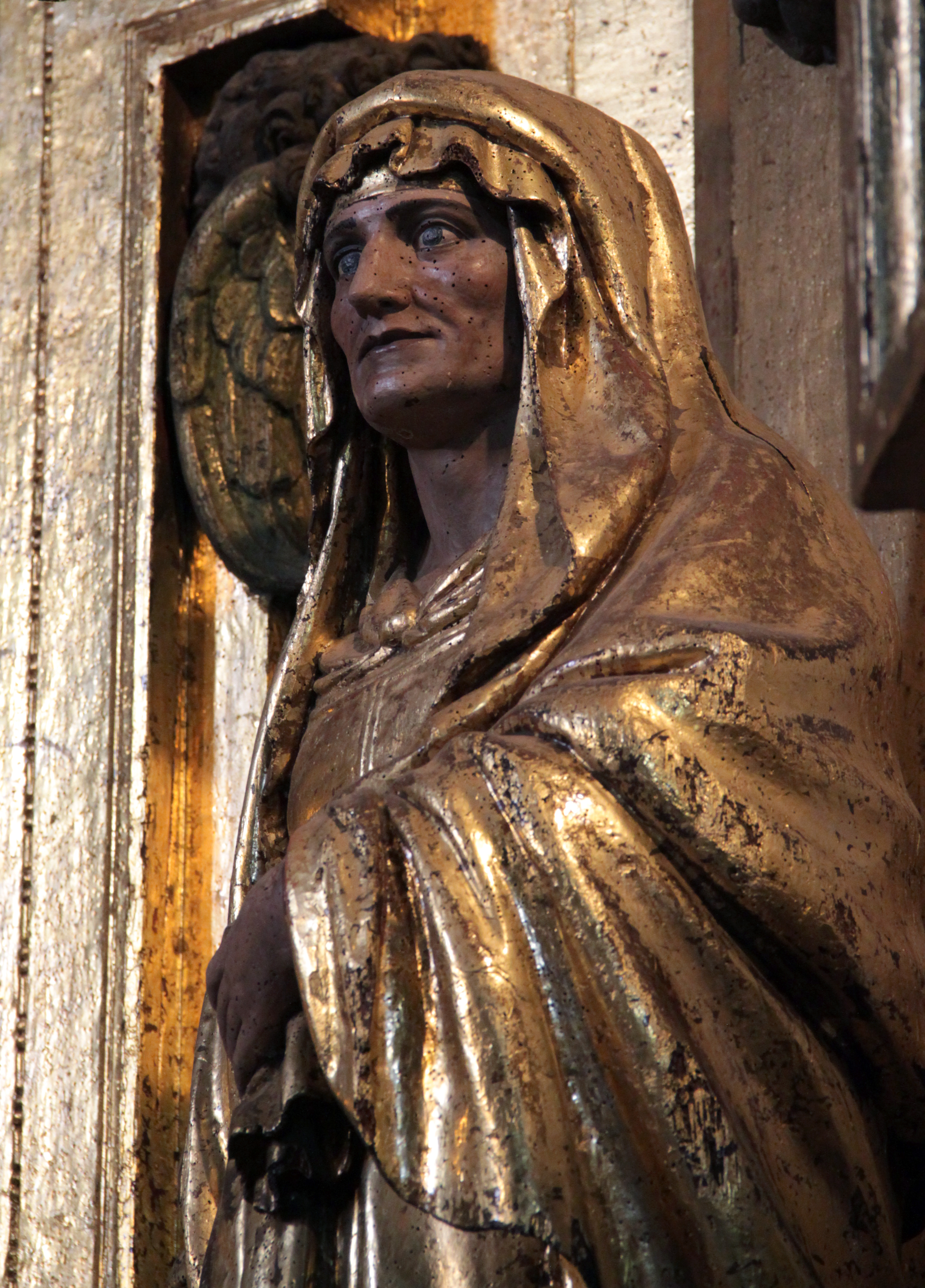
- Statue of the biblical figure of Naomi, mother-in-law of Ruth, Sanctuary of Notre-Dame de Garaison, Monléon-Magnoac
- Pronunciation: /naɪˈəʊmi/ or /ˈneɪəmi/ (UK) /neɪˈoʊmi/ (US)
- Gender: Female (as a biblical name); Unisex (as a Japanese name)

Origin
- Origin: Hebrew (as a biblical name); Japanese (as a Japanese name)

Naomi or Noemi is a given name of separate biblical Hebrew and Japanese origin used in various languages and cultures.

== Hebrew ==
Naomi (נָעֳמִי) is a feminine name of Hebrew origin. In Hebrew, it means "pleasantness" and was originally pronounced with the stress on the i (the o is a hataf qamatz, marked with a shva to indicate that it is very short). In the Book of Ruth, Naomi was the mother-in-law of Ruth, making the name Naomi a Biblical name.

Variant forms of Naomi
Arabic	نعيمة
Armenian	Նոյեմի
Czech	Noemi
Dutch	Naomi
English	Naomi, Naomie
Finnish	Noomi
French	Naomé (Belgian), Noemy, Noémi, Noémie, Noëmie
German	Noemi, Noomi
Greek	Ναούμα, Ναόμι
Guarani	Noemi
Haitian Creole	Nahomie
Hebrew	נָעֳמִי
Malay	Naomi/ناومي/ Nokmi/نوكمي/ Mekmi/ميكمي
Hungarian	Naómi, Noémi
Indonesian	Naomi
Irish	Náoimí
Italian	Noemi
Persian	نائومی
Polish	Noemi
Portuguese	Noemi, Noémia, Noêmia (Brazilian)
Russian	Наоми, Ноэми; Ноеминь (for the biblical character)
Serbian	Naomi/Наоми
Spanish	Noemi, Noemí, Nohemí (Mexican)
Tagalog	Noemí, Naomi
Thai	นาโอมิ, เนโยมิ

== Japanese ==
Naomi (なおみ, ナオミ), pronounced [naomi] is a Japanese name. Though it is a unisex name, it is primarily used by women. Naomi can be spelled using hiragana, katakana, kanji, or a combination of kana and kanji.

For example:

- なお美
- 直美
- 尚美
- 直己
- 尚己
- 直実
- 尚実
- 奈緒美
- 奈緒己
- 奈緒実

== Popularity ==
Naomi was among the five most popular names for Black newborn girls in the American state of Virginia in 2022 and again in 2023.

== People named Naomi or Noemi ==
=== Academia ===
- Naomi Beckwith (born 1976), American curator
- Naomi Chazan (born 1946), Israeli academic and politician
- Naomi Feil (1932–2023), American gerontologist and author
- Naomi E. Goldstein, clinical psychologist
- Naomi Habib, Israeli neuroscientist
- Naomi Jochnowitz, American mathematician
- Naomi Oreskes (born 1958), American science historian
- Naomi Scheman, American philosopher
- Naomi Weisstein (1939–2015), American cognitive psychologist, neuroscientist, author, and professor

=== Fine arts ===
- Marie-Noémi Cadiot (1828–1888), French sculptor of the 19th century
- Noemi Smilansky (1916–2016), Austro-Hungarian Empire-born Israeli painter

=== Authors ===
- Naomi Alderman (born 1974), English novelist and game writer
- Naomi Booth (born 1980), English fiction writer and academic
- Naomi Frankel (1918–2009), German-Israeli novelist
- Naomi Ishiguro (born 1992), British author
- Naomi Jacob (1884–1964), English author, actress and broadcaster
- Naomi Klein (born 1970), Canadian journalist, author, and social activist
- Naomi Mitchison (1897–1999), Scottish novelist and poet
- Naomi Novik (born 1973), American novelist
- Naomi Shihab Nye (born 1952), American poet and author
- Naomi Replansky (1918–2023), American poet
- Naomi Royde-Smith (1875–1964), British novelist
- Naomi Schor (1943–2001), American literary critic and theorist
- Naomi Wolf (born 1962), American feminist author
- Noémi Kiss (born 1974), Hungarian writer
- Denise Naomi Klein (1897–1985), British romantic novelist

=== Film ===
- Naomi Akimoto (秋本 奈緒美; born 1963), Japanese actress and singer
- Naomi Battrick (born 1991), British actress
- Naomi Bentley, British actress
- Naomi Childers (1892–1964), silent film actress
- Naomi Grossman (born 1975), American actress
- Naomi Foner Gyllenhaal (born 1946), American screenwriter
- Naomie Harris (born 1976), English actress
- Naomi Kawase (born 1969), Japanese film director
- Noémie Lvovsky (born 1964), French film director
- Noémie Merlant (born 1988), French actress and filmmaker
- Naomi Nagasawa (born 1971, Nao Nagasawa), Japanese voice actress
- Naomi Nishida (born 1972), Japanese actress
- Naomi Scott (born 1993), English actress, singer and musician
- Naomi Sequeira (born 1994), Australian actress and singer
- Naomi Shindō (born 1972), Japanese voice actress
- Noemi Steuer (1957–2020), Swiss actress
- Naomi Stevens (1925–2018), American character actress
- Noomi Rapace (born 1979), Swedish actress
- Naomi Wakabayashi (born 1975), Japanese voice actress
- Naomi Watanabe (渡辺直美) (born 1987), Japanese actress
- Naomi Watts (born 1968), British actress

=== Law ===
- Noemí Rial (1947–2019), Argentinian lawyer and politician
- Naomi Roht-Arriaza, American lawyer
- Noemí Sanín (born 1949), Colombian lawyer and politician

=== Modelling ===
- Naomi Campbell (born 1970), British supermodel
- Naomi Sims (1948–2009), African American model, businesswoman and author
- Noémie Lenoir (born 1979), French model
- Noemi Letizia (born 1991), Italian celebrity
- Naomi Johnson (born 1909), American showgirl

=== Music ===
- Nai Palm (born 1989), Naomi Grace Saalfield, an Australian singer and musician from the band Hiatus Kaiyote
- Noemi (singer) (born 1982), Italian singer (born Veronica Scopelliti) and music video director
- Naomi Allen, singer signed to Def Jam
- Noemí Carrión, Spanish singer and actress
- Naomi Chiaki (born 1947), Japanese singer and actress
- Noémi Győri (born 1963), Hungarian classical flautist
- Naomi Hall, American musician
- Naomi Higginson, British singer best known as Caleidra
- Naomi Judd (1946–2022), American country music singer, songwriter, and activist
- Noëmi Nadelmann (born 1962), Swiss soprano
- Naomi Neville, pseudonym of American composer Allen Toussaint (1938–2015)
- Naomi Phoenix, English singer-songwriter
- Naomi Polani (1927–2024), Israeli musical director, theater director, singer, producer, actress, and dancer
- Noémi Rime, French soprano
- Naomi Shemer (1930–2004), Israeli songwriter, the "first lady of Israeli song and poetry"
- Naomi Yang (musician) (born 1964), singer with the group Galaxie 500
- Shinta Naomi (born 1994), member of the Indonesian idol group JKT48

=== Politics ===
- Fiamē Naomi Mataʻafa (born 1957), Prime Minister of Samoa
- Naomi Gonzalez (born 1978), Democratic member of the Texas House of Representatives
- Naomi Jakobsson (born 1941), Democratic member of the Illinois House of Representatives
- Naomi Long (born 1971), Leader of the Alliance Party of Northern Ireland
- Naomi C. Matusow (born 1938), New York politician
- Noemí Rial (1947–2019), Argentine Secretary of Labor
- Noemí Santana Perera (born 1984), a member of the Podemos party of Spain
- Naomi Seymour (1938–2024), Bahamian politician
- Naomi Tokashiki (born 1962), Japanese politician
- Naomi Waqo, Kenyan politician
- Naomi Wyatt, Secretary of the Pennsylvania Office of Administration
- Naomi Yamamoto (born 1960), Canadian politician
- Ruth Noemí Colón (born 1958), Secretary of State of New York

=== Sport ===
- Noemi Basiletti (born 2006), Italian tennis player
- Noémi Boekel (born 1984), Dutch softball player
- Noemi Cantele (born 1981), Italian road bicycle racer
- Naomi Castle (born 1974), Australian water polo player
- Noémi Dakos (born 1991), Hungarian handballer
- Naomi Folkard (born 1983), English archer
- Naomi Girma (born 2000), American soccer player
- Naomi Hoshikawa (星川 直美; born 1969), Japanese cross-country skier
- Naomi Higuchi (樋口 直巳; born 1961), Japanese sport wrestler
- Naomi Isozaki, Japanese Paralympic archer
- Naomi James (born 1949), round-the-world sailor
- Naomi Knight (born 1987), ring name for American professional wrestler and dancer Trinity McCray
- Naomi Lang (born 1978), American ice dancer
- Noemi Lung (born 1968), former Romanian butterfly and medley swimmer
- Naomi Matsumoto (softball) (松本 直美; born 1968), Japanese softball player
- Naomi Mégroz (born 1998), Swiss footballer
- Naomi Mugo (born 1977), Kenyan middle distance runner
- Noémi Németh (born 1986), Hungarian hammer thrower
- Naomi Osaka (born 1997), Haitian-Japanese professional tennis player
- Naomi Russell (born 1990), Australian gymnast
- Naomi Sekido (関戸 直美; born 1969), Japanese swimmer
- Noemí Simonetto de Portela (1926–2011), Argentine athlete
- Naomi Uemura (1941–1984), Japanese adventurer, first person to reach the North Pole solo
- Naomi Takewaki (竹脇 直巳; born 1964), Japanese bobsledder
- Naomi Taniguchi (born 1936), Japanese racer
- Naomi Too, Kenyan volleyball player
- Noémi Tóth (born 1976), Italian water polo defender
- Noémi Trufán (born 1985), Hungarian handballer
- Naomi van As (born 1983), Dutch field hockey player
- Naomi Young (born 1976), Australian synchronized swimmer

=== Other notable people ===
- Naomi Ballantyne, New Zealand insurance executive
- Noémi Ban (1922–2019), Hungarian-born American Jew and Holocaust survivor
- Naomi Ceder, American software developer
- Noemí de Miguel (born 1980), Spanish sports journalist and television presenter
- Naomi Ferguson, commissioner of the New Zealand Inland Revenue Department
- Naomi Gray (1922–2006), American, first female Vice President of Planned Parenthood
- Naomi Irion (died 2022), American murder victim
- Naomi Milgrom (born 1952), Australian business owner
- Naomi Miller, American murder victim
- Naomi Sewell Richardson (1892–1993), African-American suffragist and educator
- Naomi Smalls (born 1993), the stage name of American drag queen Davis Heppenstall
- Naomi Wu (born 1994), also known as SexyCyborg, Chinese DIY maker and internet personality

== Fictional characters ==
- Naomi, in the Tokusatsu series Kamen Rider Den-O
- Naomi, in the US TV Series Supernatural
- Naomi Bennett, in the Grey's Anatomy spin-off Private Practice
- Naomi Campbell, in the television series Skins
- Naomi Clark, a socialite in the CW primetime drama show 90210
- Naomi Collins, in Dark Shadows
- Naomi Dorrit, in the American drama/adventure television series Lost
- Naomi Harper, in the American sitcom Mama's Family
- Naomi Hunter, in the Metal Gear series
- Naomi Julien, in the soap opera EastEnders
- Naomi McDuffie, title character in the TV series Naomi
- Naomi Misora, ex-FBI agent in the anime and manga series Death Note
- Naomi Umegae, a government agent with psychokinetic powers in Zettai Karen Children
- Naomi Walters, in Emmerdale
- Naomi Wildman, in the television series Star Trek: Voyager

== See also ==
- Naomi (disambiguation)
