= Nahum (disambiguation) =

Nahum is a biblical prophet.

Nahum or Nachum may also refer to:

== Places ==
- Kfar Nahum, a fishing village established during the time of the Hasmoneans, located on the northern shore of the Sea of Galilee
- Sde Nahum, a kibbutz in the Beit She'an Valley in northern Israel

== People ==
=== Mononym ===
- An ancestor of Jesus recorded by Luke, see List of minor New Testament figures § Nahum

=== Given name ===
==== Nahum ====
- Nahum (artist) (born 1979), Mexican contemporary artist and musician
- Nahum (exilarch), Jewish exilarch of the 2nd century AD residing within the Parthian Empire
- Nahum Admoni (born 1929), former Israeli intelligence officer
- Nahum Barnea (born 1944), Israeli journalist
- Nahum Barnet (1855–1931), architect working in Melbourne, Victoria, Australia
- Nahum Benari (1893–1963), Israeli writer and intellectual
- Nahum Buch (born 1932), Israeli Olympic swimmer
- Nahum Capen (1804–1886), writer, editor, bookseller and publisher in Boston
- Nahum Cohen (1863–1893), Russian writer
- Nahum Eitingon (1899–1981), Soviet intelligence officer
- Nahúm Espinoza (born 1964), Honduran football player and football manager
- Nahum Gergel (1887–1931), Jewish rights activist, humanitarian, sociologist, and author in Yiddish
- Nahum Galmor (born 1948), Italian-Israeli industrialist residing in Switzerland
- Nahum Goldmann Nahum Goldmann (1895–1982), Israeli Zionist
- Nahúm Gómez (born 1998), Mexican professional footballer
- Nahum Grymes (born 1981), better known by his stage name J. Holiday, American singer, songwriter, rapper and actor
- Nahum Het (1896–1990), Israeli politician
- Nahum J. Bachelder (1854–1934), 49th governor of New Hampshire from 1903 to 1905
- Nahum Korzhavin (1925–2018), Russian poet
- Nahum Leonard (1876–1927), co-founder of the American college fraternity Kappa Delta Phi
- Nahum Levin (1905–1967), Israeli politician
- Nahum M. Sarna (1923–2005), modern biblical scholar
- Nahum Ma'arabi, Moroccan Hebrew poet and translator of the thirteenth century
- Nahum Manbar (born 1946), Israeli businessman
- Nahum Meir Schaikewitz (1849–1905), Yiddish and Hebrew novelist and playwright
- Nahum Melvin-Lambert (born 2002), English footballer
- Nahum Mitchell (1769–1853), U.S. Representative from Massachusetts
- Nahum Nardi (1901–1977), Ukraine-born Israeli composer
- Nahum Nir (1884–1968), Zionist activist, Israeli politician
- Nahum Norbert Glatzer (1903–1990), scholar of Jewish history and philosophy from antiquity to mid 20th century
- Nahum Olin (born 1957), Mexican race car driver
- Nahum Orobitg (born 1971), Andorran alpine skier
- Nahum Parker (1760–1839), United States Senator from New Hampshire
- Nahum Rabinovitch (1928–2020), Canadian-Israeli religious Zionist rabbi and posek
- Nahum Sharfman, (died 2009), Israeli tech entrepreneur and co-founder of Shopping.com
- Nahum Slouschz (1872–1966), Russian-born Israeli writer, translator and archaeologist
- Nahum Sokolow (1859–1936), Zionist leader, author, translator, and journalist
- Nahum Sonenberg (born 1946), Israeli-Canadian microbiologist and biochemist
- Nahum Stelmach (1936–1999), Israeli football player and manager
- Nahum Stutchkoff (1893–1965), Yiddish-Polish and later Yiddish-American actor, author, lexicographer, and radio host
- Nahum Tate (1652–1715), Irish poet, hymnist and lyricist
- Nahum Tevet (born 1946), Israeli sculptor
- Nahum Trebitsch (1779–1842), Czech rabbi
- Nahum Tschacbasov (1899–1984), Russian-born American painter, teacher
- Nahum Zolotov (1926–2014), Israeli architect
- Nahum the Mede, first-century tanna of the first generation

==== Nachum ====
- Nachum Dershowitz (born 1951), Israeli computer scientist
- Nachum Dov Brayer (born 1959), rebbe of the Boyan Hasidic dynasty
- Nachum Eisenstein, rabbi of the Ma'alot Dafna neighborhood, Jerusalem, Israel
- Nachum Ish Gamzu, tanna of the second generation (first century)
- Nachum Kaplan (1811–1879), Lithuanian Talmudist, philanthropist, and Talmid Chacham
- Nachum Gutman (1898–1980), Modovan-born Israeli painter, sculptor, and author
- Nachum Heiman (1934–2016), Israeli composer and musician
- Nachum Neriya (born 1941), rosh yeshiva of Torah Betziyon in Efrat, Israel
- Nachum Segal (born 1963), American radio disc jockey
- Nachum Shifren (born c. 1951), Orthodox Lubavitcher Chassidic rabbi and surfer
- Nachum Zev Dessler (1921–2011), Orthodox Jewish rabbi

=== Middle name ===
- Abraham Nahum Stencl (1897–1983), Polish-born Yiddish poet
- Menachem Nachum Twersky (1730–1787), Ukrainian rabbi

=== Surname ===
==== Nahum ====
- Ana Nahum (1969–2015), Uruguayan journalist, writer, and presenter
- Benjamín Nahum (born 1937), Uruguayan historian, father of Ana Nahum
- Bertin Nahum (born 1969), French-Beninese entrepreneur, founder of Medtech
- Chaim Nahum (1872–1960), Jewish scholar, jurist, and linguist
- Claudia Nahum (born 1983), better known by her stage name Baby K, Italian-British singer, songwriter and rapper
- Jacques Nahum (1921–2017), French director, screenwriter, and producer
- Perrine Simon-Nahum (born 1960), contemporary French historian
- Peter Nahum (born 1947), English art dealer, author, lecturer and journalist
- Ricardo Dájer Nahum (born 1955), Mexican politician
- Stirling Henry Nahum (1906–1956), known professionally as Baron, society and court photographer in the United Kingdom

==== Nachum ====
- Eliad Nachum (born 1990), Israeli singer, songwriter and television actor known professionally as Eliad
- Nir Nachum (born 1983), Israeli footballer
- Rogel Nachum (born 1967), Israeli Olympic triple jumper
- Roy Nachum (born 1979), Israeli artist

== Other uses ==
- The Book of Nahum, prophetic book in the Hebrew and Christian Bibles
- Nahum Commentary, among the Dead Sea Scrolls
- An alternate name for the demon Aamon

== See also ==
- Naum (disambiguation)
