= Naum =

Naum may refer to:

== People ==
=== Given name ===
- Saint Naum (c. 830–910), medieval Bulgarian writer and missionary
- Naum (biblical figure) or Nahum, a minor prophet; or a figure mentioned in the genealogy of Jesus
- Naum (metropolitan) (born 1961), Macedonian Orthodox metropolitan of the Diocese of Strumica
- Naum Akhiezer (1901–1980), Soviet mathematician
- Naum Babaev (born 1977), Russian entrepreneur
- Naum Batkoski (born 1978), Macedonian footballer
- Naum Birman (1924–1989), Soviet theater and film director
- Naum Bozda (1784–1853), Serbian merchant and philanthropist
- Naum Faiq (1868–1930), Assyrian nationalist
- Naum Il'ich Feldman (1918–1994), Soviet mathematician
- Naum Gabo (1890–1977), Russian sculptor
- Naum Gurvich (1905–1981), Soviet-Jewish cardiac physician
- Naum Idelson (1885–1951), Soviet astronomer
- Naum Kleiman (born 1937), Russian historian of cinema
- Naum Koen (born 1981), UAE-based Israeli-Ukrainian businessman
- Naum Kove (born 1963), Albanian footballer
- Naum Krasner (1924–1999), Russian mathematician and economist
- Naum Krnar (died 1817), secretary to Karađorđe, the leader of the First Serbian Uprising
- Naum Levin (1933–2020), Ukrainian–Australian chess master and trainer
- Naum Luria (1892–1966), later changed his name to Artur Luriye, or Arthur Lourié, Russian composer
- Naum Meiman (1912–2001), Soviet/Israeli mathematician, physicist, dissident, and refusenik
- Naum Miladinov (1817–1897), of the Miladinov brothers, Albanian folklorists
- Naum Dhimitër Naçi (1871–1927), Albanian teacher and patriot
- Naum Olev (1939–2009), Russian lyricist
- Naum Panovski (born 1950), Macedonian theatre director and writer
- Naum Prokupets (born 1948), Moldovan-born Soviet world champion sprint canoer
- Naum Rogozhin (1879–1955), Soviet actor
- Naum Sekulovski (born 1982), Australian soccer player
- Naum Senyavin (c. 1680–1738), Russian Royal Navy officer
- Naum Shopov (1930–2012), Bulgarian actor
- Naum Z. Shor (1937–2006), Soviet and Ukrainian mathematician
- Naum Shtarkman (1927–2006), Russian pianist
- Naum Shusterman (1912–1976), Soviet engineer and Lieutenant Colonel
- Naum Sluzsny (1914–1979), Swiss pianist
- Naum Slutzky (1894–1965), Ukrainian goldsmith
- Naum Sorkin (1899–1980), Soviet military officer and diplomat
- Naum Terebinsky (1851—after 1908), Russian politician
- Naum Tomalevski (1882–1930), Bulgarian revolutionary in the Macedonian revolutionary movement
- Naum Torbov (1880–1952), Bulgarian architect
- Naum Veqilharxhi (1797–1846), Albanian lawyer and scholar
- Naum Ya. Vilenkin (1920–1991), Soviet mathematician

=== Surname ===
- Anton Naum (1829–1917), Moldavian/Romanian poet
- Dorothy Naum (1928–2008), American baseball player
- Gellu Naum (1915–2001), Romanian poet
- Said Naum (fl. 19th century), Muslim philanthropist in the Dutch East Indies

== Other uses ==
- Naum (chess), a chess engine
- Naum Theatre, a theatre and opera house in Istanbul, Turkey, 1839–1870

== See also ==
- Nahum (disambiguation)
- Naim (disambiguation)
