= Helen Jeanne Skewes Plummer =

American paleontologist

Helen Jean Plummer
- Born: Helen Jeanne Skewes; May 7, 1891; Muskegon, Michigan
- Died: January 11, 1951 (aged 59); Austin, Texas
- Occupation: micropaleontologist

Helen Jeanne Skewes Plummer (7 May 1891 – 11 January 1951) was an American micropaleontologist known for her work on Gulf Coastal Plain foraminifera. She was the first female geologist hired as an employee at a petroleum company, although women had previously consulted for the industry.

== Early life and education ==
Helen Jeanne Skewes was born on the 7th of May, 1891 in Muskegon, Michigan in the United States of America. Her father, William J. Skewes and mother, Ella L. Jackson respectively twenty-nine and thirty-one at the time of her birth. The family would later move to Illinois in her younger years where Helen would complete her high school education and develop an interest for natural sciences.

Helen Jeanne Skewes graduated from Northwestern University in 1913 with a Bachelor of Science in Geology, a male-dominated field at the time. Her studies and field experiences at Northwestern included training in mapping and analyzing geological formations. Following her graduation, she joined the Illinois Geological Survey, where she applied her academic knowledge to practical mapping projects for industrial purposes across Illinois.

Following marriage to Frederick Byron Plummer in 1918, she was known as Helen Jeanne Plummer.

In 1925, Plummer returned to Northwestern University to pursue a Master’s degree in Geology, focusing on micropaleontology. By analyzing foraminiferal assemblages, she provided insights into the stratigraphy of the Gulf Coast, particularly in Texas and Louisiana.

== Life and career ==
Following her degree, in 1914 Plummer found work at the Illinois Geological Survey before moving to Tulsa where in 1917 she was employed by the Roxana Petroleum Company, a subsidiary of the Shell Oil Company. This made her one of the first women to hold a full-time position with an oil company.

Plummer left her position at the Roxana Petroleum Company following her marriage to a colleage at the company. Despite this, she continued to engage in independent research and consulting work. Plummer collaborated with some prominent figures such as Alva Ellisor, Hedwig Kniker, and Esther Applin in developing methods to utilize microfossil data in petroleum geology.

Plummer moved countries a few times to follow her husband Frederick Plummer for his career. However, she still involved herself in geology through her husband, working with Fredrick as an occasional staff member at the University of Texas; particularly, by illustrating and editing for a map he was working on. Plummer was not credited by her husband for the work she did for him. Following Fredrick's passing in 1947, Plummer became a regular staff member of the University of Texas Bureau of Economic Geology helping establish a micropaleontological laboratory during her time there. She also became a member of the American Association of Petroleum Geologists.

Plummer used many research materials in her career that include sediment samples, locality cards, forum slides, species ID cards, and forams. Plummer worked with the University of Texas Bureau of Economic Geology in 1933 and published a research paper about new species of forams that included samples and slides.

== Legacy ==
Rugotruncana skewesae, a fossil published in “Taxonomy of the Globotruncanidae. Eclogae Geologicae Helvetiae” by Bronnimann, P., and Brown, N.K. is named after Helen Jeanne Skewes Plummer. Plummer had a display dedicated to her at the Museum of the Earth Daring to Dig exhibit in 2021, containing several sediment samples and information regarding Foram. Plummer’s collection of sediment samples spanned 3,500 localities and over 1,200 slides, the collection was left to the Paleontological Research Institution. Plummer’s most notable work was in the study of foraminifera of the Cretaceous and the Paleocene.
