= List of Kappa Delta Phi (fraternity) chapters =

Kappa Delta Phi is a collegiate social fraternity in North America. In the following list, active chapters are indicated in bold and inactive chapters are in italics.

Chapter	Charter date and range	Institution	Location	Status	Ref.
**Alpha**	April 14, 1900	Bridgewater State University	Bridgewater, Massachusetts	Active	
Beta	January 17, 1914 – 19xx ?	Salem State University	Salem, Massachusetts	Inactive	
Gamma	May 9, 1921 – 20xx ?	Keene State College	Keene, New Hampshire	Inactive	
Delta	January 6, 1927 – xxxx ?	Boston University	Boston, Massachusetts	Inactive	
Epsilon	November 3, 1928 – 199x ?; 2001–2022	Rhode Island College	Providence, Rhode Island	Inactive	(Note: Chapter formed by absorbing Delta Phi, established in 1927.)
Zeta	May 7, 1931 – 1976	University of Maine at Farmington	Farmington, Maine	Inactive	(Note: Chapter formed by absorbing Sigma Omicron Sigma, established in the 1920s.)
**Eta**	December 12, 1931	University of Maine at Machias	Machias, Maine	Active	(Note: Chapter formed by absorbing Alpha Delta Sigma.)
Theta	May 1, 1938 – 1966	Edinboro University	Edinboro, Pennsylvania	Inactive	(Note: Chapter formed by absorbing Beta Xi, established in 1928.)
Iota	May 7, 1938 – 1968; 1986–2018	University of Southern Maine	Gorham, Maine	Inactive	(Note: Chapter formed by absorbing Lambda Pi Sigma, established in 1926.)
Kappa	March 3, 1950 – 1966	Southern Connecticut State University	New Haven, Connecticut	Inactive	
**Lambda**	November 15, 1938	Husson College	Bangor, Maine	Active	(Note: Chapter formed by absorbing the Undergrad Education Club, established in 1952.)
Mu	February 10, 1952 – 2017	University of Maine at Presque Isle	Presque Isle, Maine	Inactive	
Nu	April 23, 1960 – 2022	Thomas College	Waterville, Maine	Inactive	
Xi	April 23, 1960 – 201x ?	Lyndon State College	Lyndonville, Vermont	Inactive	
Omicron	February 11, 1961 – xxxx ?	Massachusetts College of Liberal Arts	North Adams, Massachusetts	Inactive	
Pi	April 16, 1966 – 19xx ?	Cape Cod Community College	West Barnstable, Massachusetts	Inactive	
Rho	April 16, 1966 – 20xx ?	University of Maine at Fort Kent	Fort Kent, Maine	Inactive	
**Sigma**	December 3, 1966 – xxxx ?; April 13, 2019	Plymouth State University	Plymouth, New Hampshire	Active	
Tau	March 12, 1968 – xxxx ?	Castleton University	Castleton, Vermont	Inactive	
Upsilon	March 12, 1968 – 19xx ?	University of Massachusetts Lowell	Lowell, Massachusetts	Inactive	
Phi	May 18, 1968 – xxxx ?	University of Maine at Augusta	Augusta, Maine	Inactive	
**Chi**	May 18, 1968	Southern New Hampshire University	Manchester, New Hampshire	Active	
Psi	May 11, 1968 – xxxx ?	Framingham State University	Framingham, Massachusetts	Inactive	
Omega	May 15, 1971 – 19xx ?	Unity College	Unity, Maine	Inactive	
Alpha Alpha	March 1, 1972 – xxxx ?	University of Maine	Orono, Maine	Inactive	
Alpha Beta	January 29, 1994 – xxxx ?	Bryant College	Smithfield, Rhode Island	Inactive	(Note: Chapter formed by absorbing Delta Sigma Chi, established in 1947.)
**Alpha Gamma**	October 29, 1994	State University of New York at New Paltz	New Paltz, New York	Active	
Alpha Delta	November 6, 1994 - 2023	Manchester, NH	Manchester, New Hampshire	Inactive	(Note: This chapter was previously associated with St. Anselm College.)
Alpha Epsilon	February 23, 2002 – 20xx ?	Albright College	Reading, Pennsylvania	Inactive	
Alpha Zeta	April 16, 2005 – 20xx ?	Lasell University	Newton, Massachusetts	Inactive	
Alpha Eta	April 16, 2005 – 20xx ?	University of Massachusetts Amherst	Amherst, Massachusetts	Inactive	
**Alpha Theta**	March 21, 2009	York College of Pennsylvania	York, Pennsylvania	Active	
**Alpha Iota**	March 21, 2009	Shippensburg University of Pennsylvania	Shippensburg, Pennsylvania	Active	
**Alpha Kappa**	March 27, 2021	Kutztown University of Pennsylvania	Kutztown, Pennsylvania	Active	
