= Applin =

Applin is a surname. Notable people with the surname include:

- Esther Applin (1895–1972), American geologist and paleontologist
- Reginald Applin (1869–1957), British military officer
