= Naem =

Naem may refer to:

== People ==
- Harith Naem (born 2002), Malaysian football player
- Naem Nizam (born 1965), Bangladeshi journalist

== Other ==
- Naem (food), sour pork sausage in Thai and Lao cuisine
- National Academy for Educational Management

== See also ==
- Naim (disambiguation)
