= Danielle Cohen-Levinas =

French philosopher, musicologist, and a specialist of Jewish philosophy

Danielle Cohen-Levinas (born 21 April 1959 in Paris) is a French philosopher, musicologist, and a specialist of Jewish philosophy.

== Biography ==
A pianist by training and former graduate of the Conservatoire de Paris, Danielle Cohen-Levinas followed a double course in philosophy and musicology at the Université Paris Sorbonne-Paris IV and the Université Paris-1 Panthéon-Sorbonne. She entered Radio France in 1982 (France Musique and France Culture) where she worked as a radio producer until 2005.

Danielle Cohen-Levinas defended a thesis (1992) and an authorization to conduct research in philosophy (1994) at the Université Paris-1 Panthéon-Sorbonne. She was called upon to the IRCAM directed by Pierre Boulez and appointed editor in chief of the magazine Inharmoniques then Cahiers de l'IRCAM between 1989 and 1993.

She was a resident at the Villa Medicis in Rome in 1992 and returned to the CNRS in 1993 at the "Laboratoire des Arts du spectacle" then the "Laboratoire d'esthétique" of the Université Paris I Panthéon-Sorbonne where she taught as associate professor and remained there until 1998. She was program director at the Collège international de philosophie between 1996 and 2002.

Named professor of music aesthetics and philosophy of music at the Paris Sorbonne-Paris University in 1998, Danielle Cohen-Levinas founded in 1998 the "Centre d'esthétique, musique et philosophie contemporaine". In 2008, she founded and directed the "Collège des études juives et de philosophie contemporaine" which she renamed Centre Emmanuel Levinas (EA 3552) in 2012. She has been a research associate at the Husserl Archives of Paris at the École Normale Supérieure of rue d'Ulm (ENS-CNRS) since 2008 where she works more specifically on the work of Emmanuel Levinas and on his influence in international research. It is within the framework of the "Collège des études juives et de philosophie contemporaine" that she took the initiative in December 2016, in collaboration with Perrine Simon-Nahum, to ensure the revival of the "Colloque des Intellectuels juifs de langue française" (NCIJLF).

Alongside her research in aesthetics and philosophy of music, in contemporary philosophy and post-phenomenology in France, Danielle Cohen-Levinas deploys a work in Jewish philosophy, around the Judeo-German moment (H. Cohen, F. Rosenzweig, G. Scholem, L. Strauss ... ) and the Frankfurt School (Adorno, Benjamin, Bloch ... ), as well as around the revival of biblical and Talmudic studies in Europe from a philosophical point of view.

Since 2007 she has been editorial advisor by the Éditions Hermann and director of the philosophy series Le Bel Aujourd'hui which she founded the same year. In 2010, she created by Éditions Hermann a series intended to host collective works: the Rue de la Sorbonne series and, in 2011, a series devoted to Jewish thought and studies, "Panim el Panim". She is the president of Les Cahiers Maurice Blanchot, which she co-founded with Monique Antelme and Mike Holland in 2010.

Danielle Cohen-Levinas is married to composer and pianist Michaël Levinas.

== Main publications ==
=== Philosophy, music ===
- La voix au-delà du chant, une fenêtre aux ombres, édition augmentée, Paris, Librairie philosophique J. Vrin, 2006 (1st edition Michel de Maule, 1987)
- Le présent de l’opéra au XXe : chemins vers les nouvelles utopies, Paris, Kimé, 2001 (1st edition Art éd., 1994)
- Passage d’un seuil : thème et variations sur l’œuvre de Jean-Marc Bustamante, Éditions Musée de Eindhoven, 1994.
- Des notations musicales : frontières et singularités, Paris, L'Harmattan, 1996.
- La création après la musique contemporaine, L'Harmattan 1998.
- Causeries sur la musique, L'Harmattan, 1998.
- Le Style et l’Idée d’Arnold Schoenberg, new edition established and prefaced by Danielle Cohen-Levinas, first French edition, 1977, Paris, Buchet/Chastel; last édition, Paris, Buchet/Chastel, 2002, preceded by a study Prolégomènes au style et à l’idée musicale.
- Emmanuel Levinas : pour une philosophie de l’hétéronomie (dir.), Paris, Bayard, 2006
- Levinas et les théologies (codir. Shmuel Trigano), Paris, In Press, 2007
- Les territoires de la pensée (codir. Bruno Clément), Paris, PUF, 2007
- Temps historique, temps messianique, revue Lignes, October 2008.
- L’impatience des langues, cowritten with Gérard Bensussan, Éditions Hermann, 2010.
- Emmanuel Levinas et le souci de l'art (dir.), Manucius, Paris, 2010.
- Le siècle de Schoenberg (dir.), Hermann, 2010.
- Lire Totalité et Infini, Études et interprétations, Hermann, 2011.
- Europe, issue on Emmanuel Levinas, Paris, 2011.
- Levinas / Derrida : lire ensemble, coedited with Marc Crépon, Hermann, 2015.
- Figures du dehors, autour de Jean-Luc Nancy, (codir. Gisèle Berkman), ed. Cécile Defaut,
- L'énigme de l'humain, Politique et meta-politique chez Emmanuel Levinas (interviews with Miguel Abensour), Hermann, 2012.
- Europe, issue on Walter Benjamin, Paris, 2013.
- L'Opéra et son double, Paris, Vrin, 2013.
- La philosophie de Schelling. Le temps du système, le système des temps (dir. Revue Germanique Internationale), Paris, Éd. du CNRS, 2013.
- Vers une analytique de l'esprit chez Emmanuel Levinas, followed by Emmanuel Levinas's text, La compréhension de la spiritualité dans les cultures française et allemande, Paris, Payot/Rivage, 2014.
- Poesia e transcendenza - Levinas di fronte a Celan, précédé du texte d'Emmanuel Levinas, Paul Celan, dall'essere all' altro (French version, Paul Celan, de l'être à l'autre, Fata Morgana, 2002), translated into Italian by Giuseppe Pintus, Rome, Schibboleth, 2014.
- Partilha da literatura (Partage de la littérature), translated into Portuguese by Fabricia Walace Rodrigues, Gabriela Lafetá Borges, Juliana Cecci Silva, Lucas Sales Lyra, Luísa Freitas, Nivalda Assunção de Araújo et Piero Eyben, edited by Piero Eyben and Alberto Pucheu, Brasilia, Horizonte, 2014.
- Appels by Jacques Derrida, preceded by a text by Jacques Derrida, "Justices" (ed. Danielle Cohen-Levinas and Ginette Michaud), Paris, Hermann, 2014.
- Levinas-Derrida. Lire ensemble (ed. Danielle Cohen-Levinas and Marc Crépon), Paris, Hermann, 2014.
- Inventions à deux voix. Interviews with Jean-Luc Nancy, Paris, Le Felin, 2015.
- Relire Totalité et Infini d'Emmanuel Levinas, (ed. Danielle Cohen-Levinas and Alexander Schnell), Paris, Vrin, 2015, series "Problèmes et Controverses".
- Mystique et philosophie dans les trois monothéismes (ed. Danielle Cohen-Levinas, Géraldine Roux and Meryem Sebti), Paris, Hermann, 2015.
- Une percée de l'humain, followed by a text by Emmanuel Levinas, Être juif, and an unpublished letter to Maurice Blanchot, Paris, Payot/Rivages poche, 2015.
- Le devenir-juif du poème. Double envoi : Celan et Derrida, Montréal, Presses Universitaires de Montréal, 2015.
- Revue Europe, issue on Paul Celan (ed. Danielle Cohen-Levinas), Paris, 2016.
- L'antijudaïsme à l'épreuve de la philosophie et de la théologie (ed. Danielle Cohen-Levinas and Antoine Guggenheim), series "Le genre humain", Paris, Éditions du Seuil, 2016.
- Leo Strauss, judaïsme et philosophie (ed. Danielle Cohen-Levinas, Marc de Launay and Gérald Sfez), Paris, ed. Beauchesne, 2016.
- Relire Autrement qu'être ou au-delà de l'essence by Emmanuel Levinas (ed. Danielle Cohen-Levinas and Alexander Schnell), Paris, Librairie Vrin, 2016.
- La Phénoménologie de l'Esprit de Hegel aujourd'hui (ed.), Revue Germanique Internationale, Paris, ed. CNRS, 2016.
- Perspectives néokantiennes (ed. Danielle Cohen-Levinas, Juan Manuel Garrido and Marc de Launay), Paris, ed. Hermann, 2017.

=== Poetry and literary prose ===
- 2004: Un bruit dans le bruit, Paris, Mercure de France
- 2004; Le soleil est grammatical, Mercure de France
- 2004: La tristesse du Roi, Mercure de France
- 2010: Le pain des épices, cowritten with Ginette Michaud, Montréal
- 2012: Qui est comme Dieu, Paris, Belin, 2012 (poems).
