= 2012 United States Senate election in California =

- November 6, 2012
- Turnout: 55.2% (voting eligible)
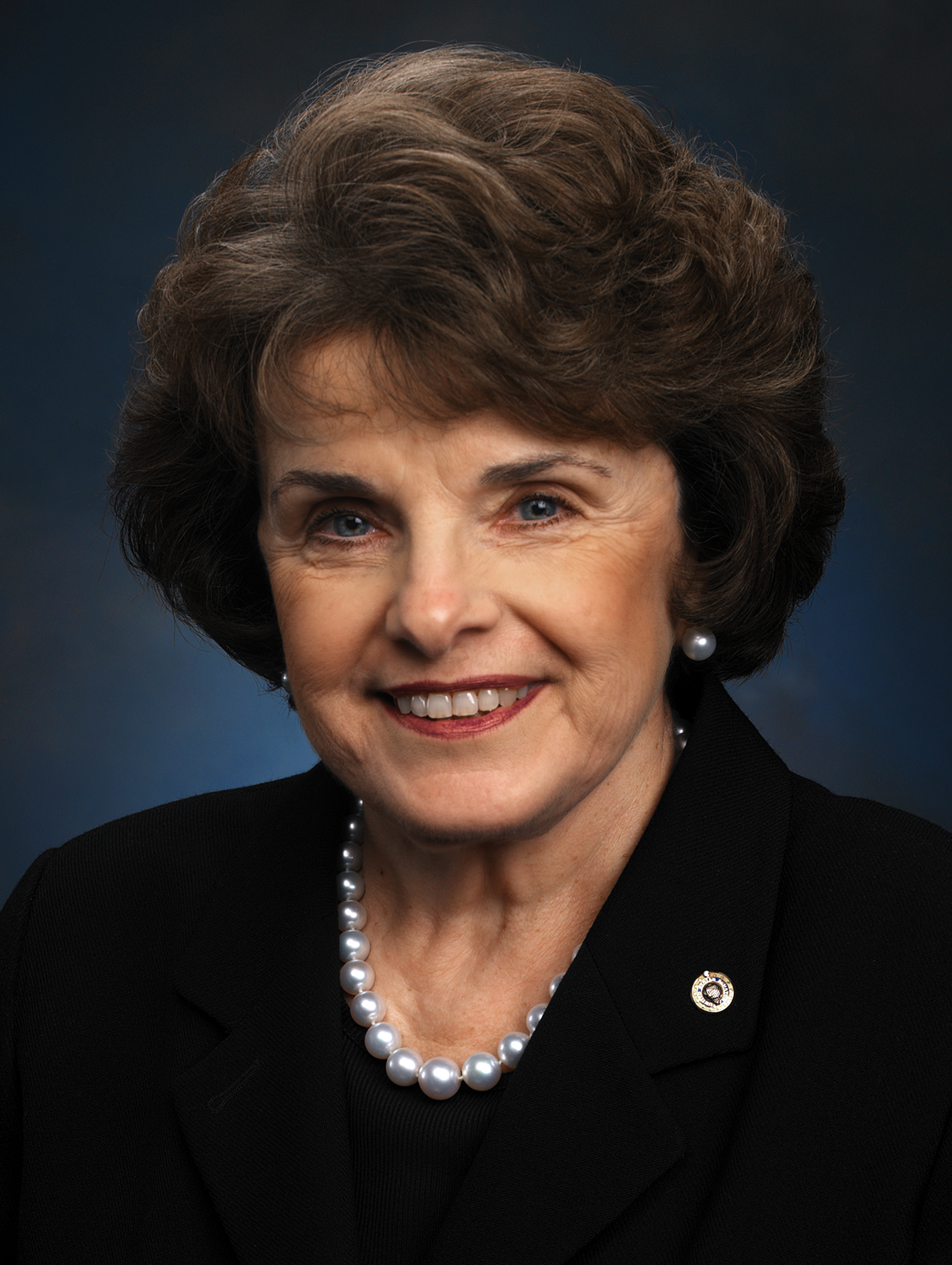

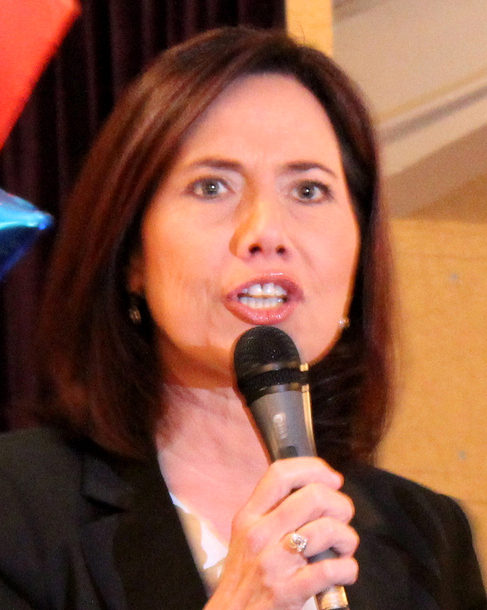
Candidate	Dianne Feinstein	Elizabeth Emken
Party	Democratic	Republican
Popular vote	7,864,624	4,713,887
Percentage	62.52%	37.48%
- Feinstein: 50–60% 60–70% 70–80% 80–90% >90% Emken: 50–60% 60–70% 70–80%
U.S. senator before election
Dianne Feinstein
Democratic
Elected U.S. Senator
Dianne Feinstein
Democratic

The 2012 United States Senate election in California took place on November 6, 2012, concurrently with the 2012 U.S. presidential election, other elections to the United States Senate and House of Representatives, and various state and local elections.

The primary election on June 5 took place under California's new blanket primary law, where all candidates appear on the same ballot, regardless of party. In the primary, voters voted for any candidate listed, or wrote in any other candidate. The top two finishers—regardless of party—advanced to the general election in November, even if a candidate managed to receive a majority of the votes cast in the June primary. In the primary, less than 15% of the total 2010 census population voted. Incumbent Democratic U.S. Senator Dianne Feinstein announced her intention to run for a fourth full term in April 2011, and finished first in the blanket primary with 49.5% of the vote. The second-place finisher was Republican candidate and autism activist Elizabeth Emken, who won 12.7% of the vote.

Feinstein ultimately defeated Emken in the general election on November 6, winning 62.5% of the vote to Emken's 37.5%. Feinstein's total of 7.86 million popular votes was the most ever received by a candidate for U.S. Senate in American history until Adam Schiff won the same seat with over 9 million votes in 2024. For a full decade, Emken was the only Republican candidate to have advanced to a general U.S. Senate election in California, as only Democratic candidates advanced to the general election in 2016 and 2018; however, this streak was broken 10 years later in 2022.

== Primary ==
=== Candidates ===
==== Democratic Party ====
- Dianne Feinstein, incumbent U.S. senator
- Colleen Shea Fernald
- David Levitt, computer scientist and engineer
- Nak Shah, environmental health consultant
- Diane Stewart, businesswoman
- Mike Strimling, attorney and former U.S. Peace Corps legal adviser

==== Republican Party ====
- John Boruff, businessman
- Oscar Alejandro Braun, businessman and rancher
- Greg Conlon, businessman and CPA
- Elizabeth Emken, candidate for the 11th congressional district in 2010
- Rogelio Gloria, U.S. Naval officer
- Dan Hughes, businessman
- Dennis Jackson
- Dirk Konopik, former congressional aide
- Donald Krampe
- Robert Lauten
- Al Ramirez, businessman
- Nachum Shifren, rabbi and state senate candidate in 2010
- Orly Taitz, dentist, Birther movement activist and candidate for California secretary of state in 2010
- Rick Williams, business attorney

==== Libertarian ====
- Gail Lightfoot, retired nurse

==== Peace and Freedom ====
- Kabiruddin Karim Ali, businessman
- Marsha Feinland, retired teacher

==== American Independent ====
- Don J. Grundmann, chiropractor

Despite Don J. Grundmann running, the American Independent Party gave their party endorsement to Republican Robert Lauten.

=== Polling ===
Open primary

Survey USA poll of 1,314 likely voters, March 29–April 2, 2012. MoE: ±2.8%
Party	Candidate	Votes	%
Democratic	Dianne Feinstein (incumbent)		51
Republican	Dan Hughes		2
Republican	Elizabeth Emken		2
Democratic	Diane Stewart		1
Republican	John Boruff		1
Republican	Rick Williams		1
Republican	Al Ramirez		1
Republican	Robert Lauten		1
Republican	Orly Taitz		1
Libertarian	Gail Lightfoot		1
Democratic	David Alex Levitt		1
Republican	Greg Conlon		1
Republican	Dennis Jackson		1
Republican	Donald Krampe		1
American Independent	Don J. Grundmann		1
Republican	Oscar Alejandro Braun		0
Republican	Dirk Allen Konopik		0
Democratic	Mike Strimling		0
Democratic	Nak Shah		0
Democratic	Colleen Shea Fernald		0
Peace and Freedom	Marsha Feinland		0
Republican	Rogelio T. Gloria		0
Peace and Freedom	Kabiruddin Karim Ali		0
Republican	Nachum Shifren		0
n/a	Undecided		30
Total votes			

Survey USA poll of 1,232 likely voters, May 27–29, 2012. MoE: ±2.8%
Party	Candidate	Votes	%
Democratic	Dianne Feinstein (incumbent)		42
Republican	Elizabeth Emken		4
Republican	Dan Hughes		4
Republican	Rick Williams		3
Republican	Al Ramirez		3
Republican	Donald Krampe		2
Democratic	Diane Stewart		2
Democratic	David Alex Levitt		2
Libertarian	Gail Lightfoot		2
Republican	Orly Taitz		1
Republican	Greg Conlon		1
Republican	Robert Lauten		1
Republican	Nachum Shifren		1
Republican	Dennis Jackson		1
Republican	John Boruff		1
Republican	Dirk Allen Konopik		1
Democratic	Colleen Shea Fernald		1
Democratic	Mike Strimling		1
Peace and Freedom	Marsha Feinland		1
American Independent	Don J. Grundmann		1
Republican	Oscar Alejandro Braun		0
Peace and Freedom	Kabiruddin Karim Ali		0
Democratic	Nak Shah		0
Republican	Rogelio T. Gloria		0
n/a	Undecided		24
Total votes			

=== Results ===
Primary results by county: Feinstein ≥ 20% Feinstein ≥ 30% Feinstein ≥ 40% Feinstein ≥ 50% Feinstein ≥ 60% Feinstein ≥ 70%

United States Senate primary election in California, 2012
Party	Candidate	Votes	%
Democratic	Dianne Feinstein (incumbent)	2,392,822	49.3%
Republican	Elizabeth Emken	613,613	12.6%
Republican	Dan Hughes	323,840	6.7%
Republican	Rick Williams	157,946	3.3%
Republican	Orly Taitz	154,781	3.2%
Republican	Dennis Jackson	137,120	2.8%
Republican	Greg Conlon	135,421	2.8%
Republican	Al Ramirez	109,399	2.3%
Libertarian	Gail Lightfoot	101,648	2.1%
Democratic	Diane Stewart	97,782	2.0%
Democratic	Mike Strimling	97,024	2.0%
Democratic	David Levitt	76,482	1.6%
Republican	Oscar Braun	75,842	1.6%
Republican	Robert Lauten	57,720	1.2%
Peace and Freedom	Marsha Feinland	54,129	1.2%
Democratic	Colleen Shea Fernald	51,623	1.1%
Republican	Donald Krampe	39,035	0.8%
American Independent	Don J. Grundmann	33,037	0.7%
Republican	Dirk Allen Konopik	29,997	0.6%
Republican	John Boruff	29,357	0.6%
Democratic	Nak Shah	27,203	0.6%
Republican	Rogelio T. Gloria	22,529	0.5%
Republican	Nachum Shifren	21,762	0.4%
Peace and Freedom	Kabiruddin Karim Ali	12,269	0.3%
Republican	Linda R. Price (write-in)	25	0.0%
Total votes		4,852,406	100.0%

=== Election contest ===
In July 2012, Taitz sued to block the certification of the primary election results, alleging "rampant election fraud", but her suit was denied.

== General election ==
=== Fundraising ===
Candidate (party)	Receipts	Disbursements	Cash on hand	Debt
Dianne Feinstein (D)	$12,673,306	$12,105,960	$865,541	$373,734
Elizabeth Emken (R)	$1,114,350	$1,110,209	$4,140	$4,479
Source: Federal Election Commission

==== Top contributors ====
Dianne Feinstein	Contribution	Elizabeth Emken	Contribution
Pacific Gas and Electric Company	$120,700	Thomas H. Lee Partners	$10,000
JStreetPAC	$82,171	DevicePharm, Inc.	$7,500
General Atomics	$56,750	Troy Group	$7,500
Edison International	$54,250	Jelly Belly	$5,500
General Dynamics	$43,500	Autism Advocate	$5,000
BAE Systems	$40,000	Geier Group	$5,000
Diamond Foods	$31,599	Generations Healthcare	$5,000
Northrop Grumman	$30,800	Gingery Development	$4,000
International Alliance of Theatrical Stage Employees	$30,000	MIR3, Inc.	$3,000
Wells Fargo	$27,250	Northrop Grumman	$2,800
Source: OpenSecrets

==== Top industries ====
Dianne Feinstein	Contribution	Elizabeth Emken	Contribution
Lawyers/law firms	$565,129	Retired	$63,849
Retired	$463,058	Republican/Conservative	$35,800
Agribusiness	$367,132	Financial institutions	$26,100
Real estate	$334,321	Real estate	$19,200
Lobbyists	$324,196	Business services	$16,000
Financial institutions	$321,744	Misc. finance	$12,750
Electric utilities	$313,450	Printing & publishing	$8,000
Entertainment industry	$300,321	Food & beverage	$6,000
Women's issues	$207,449	Petroleum industry	$6,000
High-tech industry	$205,789	Lawyers/law firms	$5,458
Source: OpenSecrets

=== Candidates ===
- Dianne Feinstein (D), incumbent U.S. senator
- Elizabeth Emken (R), former vice president of Autism Speaks

=== Debates ===
No debates were scheduled. Senator Feinstein decided to focus on her own campaign rather than debate her challenger.

=== Predictions ===
Source	Ranking	As of
The Cook Political Report	Solid D	November 1, 2012
Sabato's Crystal Ball	Safe D	November 5, 2012
Rothenberg Political Report	Safe D	November 2, 2012
Real Clear Politics	Safe D	November 5, 2012

=== Polling ===
Poll source	Date(s) administered	Sample size	Margin of error	Dianne Feinstein (D)	Elizabeth Emken (R)	Other	Undecided
SurveyUSA	May 27–29, 2012	1,575	±2.5%	50%	34%	—	15%
The Field Poll	June 21 – July 2, 2012	848	±3.5%	51%	32%	—	17%
CBRT Pepperdine	July 30 – August 1, 2012	873	±3.3%	46%	34%	—	21%
SurveyUSA	September 9–11, 2012	524	±4.2%	55%	37%	—	9%
The Field Poll	September 6–18, 2012	902	±3.4%	57%	31%	—	12%
SurveyUSA	October 7–9, 2012	539	±4.3%	54%	35%	—	10%
Reason-Rupe	October 11–15, 2012	508	±5.1%	60%	34%	2%	5%
LA Times/USC	October 15–21, 2012	1,440	±n/a	55%	38%	1%	6%
The Field Poll	October 17–24, 2012	815	±3.6%	56%	32%	—	12%
The Field Poll	October 25–30, 2012	751	±3.6%	54%	33%	—	13%

=== Results ===
2012 United States Senate election in California
Party	Candidate	Votes	%	±%
Democratic	Dianne Feinstein (incumbent)	7,864,624	62.52%	+3.09%
Republican	Elizabeth Emken	4,713,887	37.48%	+2.46%
Total votes		12,578,511	100.00%	N/A
Democratic hold				

==== By county ====
County	Dianne Feinstein Democratic		Elizabeth Emken Republican		Margin		Total votes cast
County	#	%	#	%	#	%	Total votes cast
Alameda	468,456	81.93%	103,313	18.07%	365,143	63.86%	571,769
Alpine	409	64.11%	229	35.89%	180	28.21%	638
Amador	7,051	40.80%	10,232	59.20%	-3,181	-18.41%	17,283
Butte	43,681	49.27%	44,981	50.73%	-1,300	-1.47%	88,662
Calaveras	8,878	41.57%	12,479	58.43%	-3,601	-16.86%	21,357
Colusa	2,482	43.28%	3,253	56.72%	-771	-13.44%	5,735
Contra Costa	300,194	70.06%	128,310	29.94%	171,884	40.11%	428,504
Del Norte	4,065	47.45%	4,502	52.55%	-437	-5.10%	8,567
El Dorado	35,776	41.31%	50,820	58.69%	-15,044	-17.37%	86,596
Fresno	129,267	51.14%	123,499	48.86%	5,768	2.28%	252,766
Glenn	3,520	38.96%	5,515	61.04%	-1,995	-22.08%	9,035
Humboldt	36,162	65.04%	19,437	34.96%	16,725	30.08%	55,599
Imperial	25,342	67.24%	12,346	32.76%	12,996	34.48%	37,688
Inyo	3,333	42.58%	4,494	57.42%	-1,161	-14.83%	7,827
Kern	92,252	42.29%	125,906	57.71%	-33,654	-15.43%	218,158
Kings	13,304	42.61%	17,916	57.39%	-4,612	-14.77%	31,220
Lake	13,543	58.97%	9,424	41.03%	4,119	17.93%	22,967
Lassen	3,150	29.89%	7,390	70.11%	-4,240	-40.23%	10,540
Los Angeles	2,183,654	71.53%	868,924	28.47%	1,314,730	43.07%	3,052,578
Madera	15,997	41.08%	22,942	58.92%	-6,945	-17.84%	38,939
Marin	105,153	80.11%	26,105	19.89%	79,048	60.22%	131,258
Mariposa	3,551	40.27%	5,268	59.73%	-1,717	-19.47%	8,819
Mendocino	24,254	70.35%	10,224	29.65%	14,030	40.69%	34,478
Merced	32,955	54.97%	27,000	45.03%	5,955	9.93%	59,955
Modoc	1,188	30.08%	2,761	69.92%	-1,573	-39.83%	3,949
Mono	2,600	51.96%	2,404	48.04%	196	3.92%	5,004
Monterey	84,585	69.61%	36,930	30.39%	47,655	39.22%	121,515
Napa	37,122	66.52%	18,682	33.48%	18,440	33.04%	55,804
Nevada	25,495	50.41%	25,078	49.59%	417	0.82%	50,573
Orange	515,902	47.48%	570,574	52.52%	-54,672	-5.03%	1,086,476
Placer	68,599	41.39%	97,139	58.61%	-28,540	-17.22%	165,738
Plumas	4,162	42.81%	5,560	57.19%	-1,398	-14.38%	9,722
Riverside	327,698	51.90%	303,651	48.10%	24,047	3.81%	631,349
Sacramento	302,078	60.72%	195,412	39.28%	106,666	21.44%	497,490
San Benito	11,389	61.09%	7,255	38.91%	4,134	22.17%	18,644
San Bernardino	298,067	54.05%	253,433	45.95%	44,634	8.09%	551,500
San Diego	622,781	54.41%	521,884	45.59%	100,897	8.81%	1,144,665
San Francisco	305,126	88.52%	39,589	11.48%	265,537	77.03%	344,715
San Joaquin	113,706	57.00%	85,787	43.00%	27,919	13.99%	199,493
San Luis Obispo	62,216	50.80%	60,262	49.20%	1,954	1.60%	122,478
San Mateo	213,503	77.22%	62,979	22.78%	150,524	54.44%	276,482
Santa Barbara	93,921	59.62%	63,599	40.38%	30,322	19.25%	157,520
Santa Clara	454,647	72.93%	168,722	27.07%	285,925	45.87%	623,369
Santa Cruz	91,109	78.16%	25,463	21.84%	65,646	56.31%	116,572
Shasta	27,155	36.53%	47,184	63.47%	-20,029	-26.94%	74,339
Sierra	677	38.58%	1,078	61.42%	-401	-22.85%	1,755
Siskiyou	8,196	41.97%	11,334	58.03%	-3,138	-16.07%	19,530
Solano	98,251	65.99%	50,634	34.01%	47,617	31.98%	148,885
Sonoma	154,892	73.71%	55,256	26.29%	99,636	47.41%	210,148
Stanislaus	78,470	51.79%	73,060	48.21%	5,410	3.57%	151,530
Sutter	12,395	41.17%	17,715	58.83%	-5,320	-17.67%	30,110
Tehama	8,349	36.96%	14,241	63.04%	-5,892	-26.08%	22,590
Trinity	2,658	47.46%	2,943	52.54%	-285	-5.09%	5,601
Tulare	42,395	42.87%	56,499	57.13%	-14,104	-14.26%	98,894
Tuolumne	10,336	42.78%	13,823	57.22%	-3,487	-14.43%	24,159
Ventura	171,483	54.42%	143,603	45.58%	27,880	8.85%	315,086
Yolo	49,148	67.68%	23,468	32.32%	25,680	35.36%	72,616
Yuba	7,896	40.97%	11,376	59.03%	-3,480	-18.06%	19,272
Totals	7,864,624	62.52%	4,713,887	37.48%	3,150,737	25.05%	12,578,511

Counties that flipped from Democratic to Republican

- Butte (largest city: Chico)
- Del Norte (largest community: Crescent City)
- Trinity (largest community: Weaverville)

==== By congressional district ====
Feinstein won 41 of the 53 congressional districts, including three held by Republicans.

District	Feinstein	Emken	Representative
1st	42%	58%	Doug LaMalfa
2nd	73%	27%	Jared Huffman
3rd	56%	44%	John Garamendi
4th	41%	59%	Tom McClintock
5th	72%	28%	Mike Thompson
6th	71%	29%	Doris Matsui
7th	53%	47%	Ami Bera
8th	43%	57%	Paul Cook
9th	60%	40%	Jerry McNerney
10th	52%	48%	Jeff Denham
11th	72%	28%	George Miller
12th	89%	11%	Nancy Pelosi
13th	91%	9%	Barbara Lee
14th	79%	21%	Jackie Speier
15th	71%	29%	Eric Swalwell
16th	59%	41%	Jim Costa
17th	75%	25%	Mike Honda
18th	72%	28%	Anna Eshoo
19th	74%	26%	Zoe Lofgren
20th	73%	27%	Sam Farr
21st	56%	44%	David Valadao
22nd	43%	57%	Devin Nunes
23rd	38%	62%	Kevin McCarthy
24th	56%	44%	Lois Capps
25th	49%	51%	Buck McKeon
26th	56%	44%	Julia Brownley
27th	65%	35%	Judy Chu
28th	73%	27%	Adam Schiff
29th	78%	22%	Tony Cárdenas
30th	69%	31%	Brad Sherman
31st	59%	41%	Gary Miller
32nd	67%	33%	Grace Napolitano
33rd	65%	35%	Henry Waxman
34th	85%	15%	Xavier Becerra
35th	68%	32%	Gloria Negrete McLeod
36th	54%	46%	Raul Ruiz
37th	86%	14%	Karen Bass
38th	67%	33%	Linda Sánchez
39th	49%	51%	Ed Royce
40th	81%	19%	Lucille Roybal-Allard
41st	63%	37%	Mark Takano
42nd	43%	57%	Ken Calvert
43rd	78%	22%	Maxine Waters
44th	85%	15%	Janice Hahn
45th	44%	56%	John B. T. Campbell III
46th	63%	37%	Loretta Sánchez
47th	61%	39%	Alan Lowenthal
48th	45%	55%	Dana Rohrabacher
49th	47%	53%	Darrell Issa
50th	40%	60%	Duncan Hunter
51st	70%	30%	Juan Vargas
52nd	54%	46%	Scott Peters
53rd	63%	37%	Susan Davis

== See also ==
- 2012 United States Senate elections
- 2012 United States House of Representatives elections in California
