= Alva C. Ellisor =

Stratigrapher

Alva Christine Ellisor
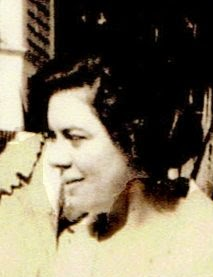
- Alva C. Ellisor in 1927
- Born: April 26, 1892; Galveston, Texas
- Died: September 22, 1964 (aged 72); Galveston, Texas
- Education: University of Texas at Austin
- Known for: Contributions to the fields of Micropaleontology, and Gulf of Mexico geology.
- Scientific career
- Fields: Petroleum Geology

Alva Christine Ellisor (1892–1964) was a geologist and one of the first female stratigraphers in North America.

== Early life ==
Alva C. Ellisor was born on April 26, 1892, in Galveston, Texas. At the age of eight, she survived the 1900 Great Galveston Hurricane. She had two infant brothers who were killed in the event. Being the valedictorian of her class, she later, in 1915, graduated as an honours student in geology from the University of Texas, and was one of the two women who graduated in her field. After graduating, Ellisor held a teaching position in Ball High School. This was short-lived as she decided to go back to university and study in hopes of becoming a professor. At the same time Ellisor was studying, she was also doing research in the field of geology under the supervision of her instructors, Professor Francis L. Whitney and Professor Hal P. Bybee. One of her first research papers was published shortly after, in 1918, which consisted of numerous discoveries of her fossils. These same fossils were included in the Handbook of Texas Cretaceous Fossils, by W.S. Adkin (1928). The same year, Ellisor began working as a professor at the University of Kansas teaching geology and in 1919 was able to apply her experience while working for the Kansas Geological Survey.

== Career ==
In 1920, Ellisor switched professions again and started working for the Humble Oil & Refining Company. She was specifically hired by Wallace Pratt to design a subsurface laboratory which works to show the development of petroleum and natural gas as well as other minerals. This is where she was really able to make a name for herself in the study of petroleum geology as well as making many firsts for women in geology. Ellisor created and opened the laboratory to focus on focusing on Tertiary and Cretaceous time periods. In just a few months after opening the laboratory, she made a major discovery of foraminifera in one of the company's wells at Goose Creek. Her study of foraminifera indicated Oligocene-aged coral reefs on the Damon Mound salt dome in Brazoria County. Some of her specimens are contained in the NPL's Type Collection. She was one of the first to see the potential for using foraminifera to correlate rocks from drilling cores. These findings would be the basis of some of her most famous writing for years to come.

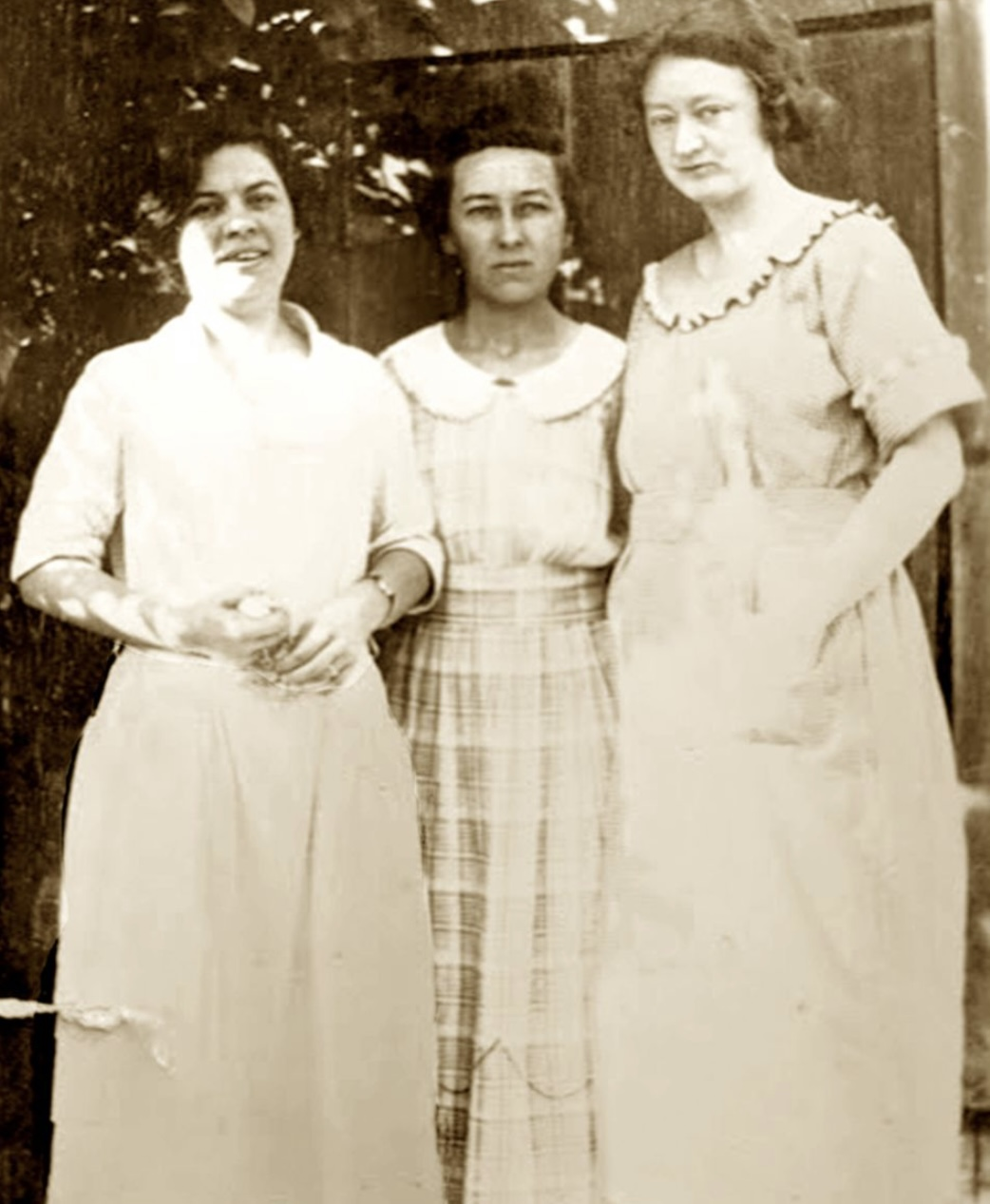
(L-R) Ellisor, Hedwig Kniker and Esther Applin

Ellisor became one of the first female stratigraphers, a leading economic micropaleontologist in the US, and has had a lasting impact in the field of geology as well as paving the way for many women in the field. When she was employed by the Humble Oil & Refining Company to work on a subsurface laboratory, she became the first woman to work on one for a company – simultaneously she was able to aid in the creation of the Houston Geological Society. In her many journals with Joseph A. Cushman, they studied the foraminiferal fauna and discovered fifteen new species and seven new varieties. Despite her contributions, she was never credited for her discovery in foraminifera in Edgar Owen's The Trek of the Oil Finders, which exclusively credited J.A Udden, Edwin T. Dumble, Joseph A. Cushman, and Jesse J. Galloway. Yet, the four could only conclude their findings only by the research of Ellisor herself, as well as her co authors Esther Applin and Hedwig Kniker. Ellisor, along with Applin and Kniker all proposed the idea of using microfossils to locate and find petroleum. Alva C. Ellisor continued to be influential on her own, having her work published by many well known geology organizations in The United States. Of her many achievements, some of her greatest positions in science were being a fellow of the Geological Society of America and being the Vice President for the Houston Geological Society for two years.

Ellisor spent over twenty years working for the Humble Oil & Refining Company until she retired in 1947. Ellisor engaged in acts of philanthropy throughout her career, donating money and her 3000 volume geologic library to the University of Texas. She died at the age of seventy-two on September 22, 1964, in Galveston, Texas.

== Awards and honors ==
- 1924 vice-president of the Houston Geological Society
- 1930 vice-president of the Houston Geological Society
- 1941 vice-president of the Society of Economic Paleontologists and Mineralogists
- 1948 Honorary member of the Houston Geological Society
- 1953 Honorable mention by the Desk & Derrick Clubs of North America (Outstanding Oil Woman of the Year)

== Works ==
- Ellisor, A. C. 1918. Species of Turritella from the Buda and Georgetown limestones of Texas, Series: University of Texas bulletin no. 1840.
- Applin, E. R., Ellisor, A. C., & Kniker, H. T. 1925. Subsurface Stratigraphy of the Coastal Plain of Texas Louisiana. AAPG Bulletin, Vol. 9, No. 1, p. 79-122.
- Ellisor, A. C. 1926. Coral Reefs in the Oligocene of Texas. AAPG Bulletin, Vol. 10, No. 10, p. 976-985.
- Cushman, J. A., Ellisor, A. C. 1945. The Foraminiferal Fauna of the Anahuac Formation. Journal of Paleontology, Vol. 19, No. 6, p. 545-572.
- Ellisor, A. C. 1925. The Age and Correlation of the Chalk at White Cliffs, Arkansas, with Notes on the Subsurface Correlations of Northeast Texas. AAPG Bulletin, Vol. 9, No. 8, p. 1152-1164.
- Ellisor, A. C. 1929. Ellisor, A.C. Correlation of the Claiborne of East Texas with the Claiborne of Louisiana. AAPG Bulletin, Vol. 13, No. 10, p. 1335-1346.
- Ellisor, A.C. 1936. Jackson Group of Formations in Texas with Notes on Frio and Vicksburg. AAPG Bulletin, Vol. 17, No. 11.
- Ellisor, A.C. 1940. Subsurface Miocene of Southern Louisiana. AAPG Bulletin, Vol. 24, No. 3, p. 435-475.
- Ellisor, A. C. 1947. Rockhounds of Houston.
