= Dorsum Cushman =

Wrinkle ridge on the Moon

Dorsum Cushman is a wrinkle ridge at 1.0°N 49.0°E in Mare Fecunditatis on the Moon. It is 86 km long and was named after American micropaleontologist Joseph Augustine Cushman in 1976.
