= Ana Nahum =

- Born: 31 October 1969; Montevideo, Uruguay
- Died: 9 January 2015 (aged 45); Montevideo, Uruguay
- Occupations: Journalist, writer, presenter
- Children: 2
- Father: Benjamín Nahum

Ana Nahum (31 October 1969 – 9 January 2015) was a Uruguayan journalist, writer, and presenter.

== Biography ==
The daughter of writer Benjamín Nahum, Ana Nahum graduated with a licentiate in communications. She worked at Océano FM in 1992, at Canal 4 in 1994, and starting in 2009 she was host of the television program Hola Vecinos on Canal 10.

She wrote a book about the history and analysis of the role of women in Uruguayan politics called Mujeres y política (Women and Politics), which contains the testimony of three Uruguayan women leaders: Beatriz Argimón, Glenda Rondán, and Mónica Xavier.

She was married and mother of the sons Sebastián and Joaquín. She was recognized as a Woman of the Year by Juan Herrera Productions in 2011 for conduct in television.

She died of cancer on 9 January 2015 at age 45.

== Work ==
- 1994–1997, Muy Buenos Días, Canal 4
- 1998–2000, Hola Gente, Canal 12
- 2001–2003, Tveo a Diario y Tveo Informa, Canal 5
- 2004–2007, Con Mucho Gusto, Canal 10
- 2004, El Sentido del Sexo, Canal 10
- 2008–2009, La Mañana, Canal 5
- 2010–2014, Hola Vecinos, Canal 10
- 2014, Mujeres y política (ISBN 9789974108721)

Ana Nahum is considered to be unique among Uruguayan television journalists, having spent several years as a figure on morning programs, and having worked for all of the broadcast television channels.
