= Nahum Benari =

Israeli writer and trade unionist

- נַחוּם בֶּנאֲרִי
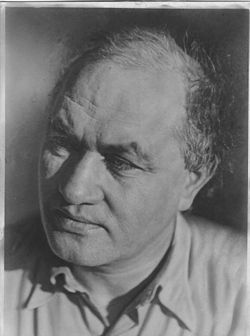
- Nahum Benari, 1950
- Born: Nahum Brodski; January 3, 1893; Lebedyn, Ukraine
- Died: December 24, 1963 (aged 70); Israel
- Resting place: Ein Harod Meuchad, Israel tombstone picture
- Known for: promoting many Israeli cultural initiatives in the 1940s-50s

Nahum Benari (Hebrew: נַחוּם בֶּנאֲרִי; January 3, 1893 – December 24, 1963) was an Israeli writer and an intellectual. He is known mainly for promoting many Israeli cultural initiatives, primarily in the 1940s-50s, through his position as a member of the management body of the Histadrut (abbreviation for lit. The General Federation of Laborers in the Land of Israel).

Benari was a prolific writer, who wrote on several subjects in various genres: treatises, pamphlets, plays, and more; about kibbutz and Zionist ideals and practices; about the making of ceremonies and festivals for Sabbath, holidays, and memorial days; about philosophy; and about stories and thoughts aroused by the day to day reality of the yishuv and Israel in its first years. Moreover, he translated books of other authors and edited books and journals. He was a man of creative imagination who could translate ideas and thoughts about culture and education into actions.

== Biography ==
=== Early life in Ukraine ===
Benari was born Nahum Brodski in 1893, in the Jewish part of the town of Lebedyn in Ukraine, then part of the Russian Empire. His father, Arie Leib, held a senior position at a sugar factory, and his mother, Devora, was a housewife; he was their firstborn of ten children. As an adolescent he was sent to learn in a yeshiva (a religious school), but the studies of Halakha (religious laws) didn't satisfy his curiosity. He moved from yeshiva to yeshiva across Ukraine until he arrived at Odessa, where he attended the yeshiva of Rabbi Chaim Tchernowitz (Rav Tza'ir) and graduated in 1911. Among his teachers in this yeshiva were well-known authors such as Hayim Nahman Bialik and Mendele Mocher Sforim, and there he absorbed Zionist values, which he passed on to his brothers and sisters.

=== First years in the Land of Israel ===
In May 1914, a few months before the beginning of the First World War, Benari arrived in the Land of Israel, then part of the Ottoman Empire. During the first years after making Aliyah, he hired himself out as a farm worker, first at Degania and then at Ilaniya. In those years he became acquainted with immigrants of the Second Aliyah and Third Aliyah. He wrote the article "HaKabtzanim HaSmechim" (lit. The Happy Beggars) about this period. During this period he also met his first wife, Sonia Dubnov, with whom he had three children.

After the First World War, at the time of the British Mandate for Palestine, he moved with his family to wherever he could find a job: he planted trees on Mount Carmel, served as a court clerk in Tel Aviv, and took on some temporary jobs in Jerusalem. While working as a court clerk he wrote the article "Inyanei Beit Din" (lit. court matters). During this period his brothers and sisters made Aliyah along with their mother; most of them settled in the rural Israeli settlements called Kibbutzim (plural of Kibbutz). In October 1922, after hearing of his father's death, he changed his surname to Benari (Hebrew: בֶּנאֲרִי, lit. lion's son); his brothers and sisters followed him in this act.

=== Living at Ein Harod ===
At the beginning of 1925, Benari and his family joined a kibbutz named Ein Harod. He worked in the fields and in the vineyard. At Ein Harod he was among those who conceived the Kibbutz's way of celebrating Jewish holidays. A main theme in the newly designed festivals and ceremonies was the agricultural year circle. For example, at Passover they established a ceremony for the beginning of the harvest, and at Shavuot a secular celebration of Bikkurim (Hebrew: ביכורים, lit. first fruits). Benari also edited the periodical MiBifnim (Hebrew: מבפנים, lit. from the inside). The periodical of the kibbutzim organization HaKibbutz HaMeuchad (lit. the unified kibbutz or united kibbutz), stemmed from Ein Harod's journal. Benari lived in Ein Harod until 1942, and there he met his second wife, Yehudit Mensch, with whom he had one son.

=== Hechalutz activity ===
Benari was sent abroad on Hechalutz missions three times. In the years 1927-1929 he was sent by Ein Harod's leadership to Hechalutz center in Warsaw, Poland. During those two years, he lectured to and talked with young Jews in towns and Chavot Hachshara (lit. training farms), in Poland, Germany, Lithuania, and The Czech Republic. Additionally, he edited Hechalutz's journal called HeAtid (Hebrew: העתיד, lit. The Future). Between 1934 and 1936 he was sent for the second time by Ein Harod's leadership to the Hechalutz center in Warsaw, this time he also acted as a delegate to the 19th Zionist Congress at Lucerne, Switzerland. In the latter part of the Second World War, from October 1944 to January 1945, he went on his third mission. This time he was sent with two other men by Solel Boneh, a construction company, to join its work teams in the oil refineries in Abadan, Iran. Benari went as a social consultant, but he actually operated undercover as a Hechalutz emissary to encourage Zionist activity among the Jewish communities in Iran, Iraq, and Syria.

Alongside performing missions abroad, Benari was also a pamphleteer of Hechalutz and the Zionist ideology.

== Associations for Culture and Education ==
At the beginning of 1942, Benari left Ein Harod with his family in order to focus on his cultural and educational activities. First he worked for Solel Boneh, but it wasn't long before he joined The Center of Culture and Education of the Histadrut. He was among the founders of Associations for Culture and Education (Hebrew: מפעלי תרבות וחינוך) and ran it for nearly twenty years. In this office he promoted many cultural initiatives by supplying funds and an organizational roof. Among the most eminent associations that were raised under his service were:

1. Omanut Laam Association (Hebrew: אמנות לעם, lit. culture for the people) - An association, founded as Telem, which connected established theaters with peripheral and rural settlements and workers' committees.
2. Cinema Department - A department that distributed selected movies, in 16 mm film, to all periphery communities and military camps, thus enabling movie screening everywhere.
3. Artists and intellectuals meetings with workmen - Arranging meetings between all kinds of artists (such as authors, poets, painters, and sculptors) or thinkers and the workmen of different places such as industrial plants, agriculture based communities (kibbutz and moshav), immigrant camps (Ma'abarot), and military camps.
4. Israeli Institute for Education by Correspondence (Hebrew name (acronym): Mishlav) - An institute that preceded the foundation of the Open University of Israel.
5. Sifri (Hebrew: ספרי, lit. my book) - A publishing house and a book store.
6. Folk dancing class - This class gave a stage to choreographers of folk dances who used the folk music of the time. This class established the foundations for widening folk dancing activity in Israel, an activity existing to this day.

Alongside enabling the formation of new cultural establishments, the Associations for Culture and Education, under Benari management, also supported existing foundations such as HaOhel Theater (Hebrew: האהל, lit. The Tent), The Israeli Opera, Inbal Dance Theater, and Am Oved publishing house.

== Selected works – author ==
1. Inyanei Beit Din (lit. court matters), October 1919. An article in "Adama", editor: Yosef Haim Brenner
2. An article in Gam Ze Coach (lit. a kind of strength), 1921. 39 p. - A publication for the foundation of the Histadrut. Additional authors: Y. Tabentkin, S. Yavne'eli (Hebrew Wikipedia article on S. Yavne'eli), M. Kushnir, D. Zakai (Hebrew Wikipedia article on D. Zakai), B. Katznelson, S. Lavi.
3. Pamphlets in Yiddish about Kvutza (Israeli settlement) (Hebrew Wikipedia article on Kvutza (Israeli settlement)), Kibbutz and HeChalutz. About 5 pamphlets, 1928, 1929, 1935. pub. HeChalutz.
4. Ein Harod, 1931. pub. Amanut, 89 p. - From a series for the youth by JNF
5. LeToldot HaKvutsah VeHaKibbuz (lit. History of Kvutza and Kibbutz), 1934. pub. Hechalutz, booklet 132 p. - was translated into German, English, Italian, Romanian and Czech.
6. Toldot Tenuat HaPoalim BeErets Yisrael (lit. the history of workers movement in the Land of Israel), 1936. 135 p.
7. Shabat UMoed (lit. Sabbath and Holidays), 1946. pub. Center of Culture and Education, 51 p. - About the formation of ceremonies and festivals for Sabbath and holidays
8. HaTsiyonut HaSotsialistit (lit. The socialist Zionism), 1950. pub. Institute for Zionist education Jerusalem, booklet 63 p. - from the series Sidra Tsiyonit Ktana (lit. Zionist small series)
9. Olamo Shel Adam (lit. Mans' world), 1950, pub. N. Tverski (Hebrew Wikipedia article on N. Tverski), 200 p. - Contemplation and research
10. Mahazot Ketanim (lit. small plays), 1950. 109 p. - Short plays and sketches
11. Tuval Kayin (lit. Tubal-cain), 1951 (1950). - A play
12. Tnuat HaAvoda HaYisraelit (lit. the Israeli labor movement), 1954. pub. Mishlav - A source book for students about the origins, foundation and history of said movement.
13. Erkhe Ruach VeSifrut (lit. spirit and literature values), 1954. pub. Center of Culture and Education, 248 p. - About authors, books and people
14. Shivah Asar Maarchonim (lit. 17 sketches), 1954. 148 p.
15. Eshkolot (lit. assemblage), 1955. pub. M. Neuman, 509 p. - A study on the bible in the Jewish literature through the generations
16. El HaShemesh (lit. to the sun), 1955. pub. Amichai, 93 p. - Stories for children and childhood memories.
17. Ohalim BaRuach (lit. tents in the wind), 1955. - A play
18. Arachim BeTenuat HaAvoda HaYisraelit (lit. Israeli labor movement values), 1959. pub. Urim, booklet 83 p.
19. Kochvei Lechet (lit. planets), 1961. pub. Amichai, 93 p. - Stories for children.
20. Netivim (lit. paths), 1967. pub. Associations for Culture and Education, 267 p. - Rules of society and culture
21. Zichronot Al Emek Yizrael (lit. memories from Jezreel Valley), booklet 17 p.
22. Sukkot - Chag HaAsif (lit. Sukkot - harvest time festival). Booklet, 30 p. - Additional authors: Sara Levi-Tanai, Tuvia Ovadyahu, Gavriela Aran.

== Selected works – editor ==
1. LeSukot (lit. for Sukkot), 1945. 20 p. - Songs for Sukkot
2. Kinus Gvat, (lit. Gvat convention), July 1945. Booklet 54 p. - during the kibbutz movement division period (Hebrew Wikipedia article on kibbutz movement division period), written in support of Zionist socialists union. Additional editor: Michael Asaf (Hebrew Wikipedia article on Michael Asaf).
3. LeShabat (lit. for Sabbath), 1947. 42 p.- Songs for Sabbath
4. Yalkut Yom Tov (lit. holidays collection), 1953. pub. Am Oved, 208 p. - Readings for Sabbath, holidays and memorial days.
5. Orot (lit. lights), 1954 (1953). pub. Center of Culture and Education, 163 p. - A debate on culture and education.
6. Mikraot LeShabat (lit. readings for Sabbath), 1954 (1964). pub. M. Neuman - Readings and comments for Sabbath by order of the weekly Torah portion (Parashat HaShavua)
7. Sefer HaYashar (lit. book of righteous), 1959. pub. M. Neuman, volume I 182 p., volume II 337 p. - Torah folktales
8. Yosef Trumpeldor (lit. Joseph Trumpeldor), 1960. with editor A. Cna'ani, 83 p.
9. Yosef Trumpeldor (lit. Joseph Trumpeldor), 1970. with editor A. Cna'ani, booklet 96 p. - His life and time, pictures and texts for the 50th anniversary of Tel Hai battle.
10. Language Editor of Omer (Hebrew: אֹמֶר, lit. verbal expression), a vowelized newspaper for newcomers.
