= Naim (disambiguation) =

Naim is a male given name and a surname. Naim may also refer to:

== Acronyms ==
- Nucleotide Analog Interference Mapping, a molecular biology technique

== Places ==
- Arab al-Na'im, a Bedouin village in northern Israel
- Bani Na'im, a Palestinian-Arab town in the Judea
- Dar-Naim, Mauritania
- Dhi Na'im District, in Al Bayda' Governorate, Yemen
- Mexico City Texcoco Airport, NAIM or NAICM, a partially-built airport cancelled in 2019
- Nain, Naim, a village mentioned in New Testament
- Al Nuaim, a bedouin tribe in the Arab states of the Persian Gulf
- Noaim, a neighbourhood in Manama, capital of Bahrain
- Qalai Naeem, village in eastern Afghanistan

== Tribes ==
- Na'im (Syria), an Arab tribe in Syria
- Na'im (UAE), an Arab tribe in the United Arab Emirates

== Other uses ==
- Naim (chat program), a messaging and chat software
- Naim Audio, a UK manufacturer of audio and hifi equipment
- Nayeem (name), alternative form of the name
