= Nahum Leonard =

American educator and fraternity founder

- Born: Nathum Leonard III; December 11, 1876; Bridgewater, Massachusetts, U.S.
- Died: September 11, 1927 (aged 50); Plymouth, Massachusetts, U.S.
- Burial place: Mt. Prospect Cemetery, Bridgewater, Massachusetts
- Education: Bridgewater State College; Harvard University
- Occupations: Superintendent of Schools, principal, and educator
- Employer(s): Sanderson Academy Keene Normal School North Andover Public Schools
- Known for: Founding Kappa Delta Phi

Nahum Leonard III (December 11, 1876 - September 11, 1927) was an American educator and one of the founders of the college fraternity Kappa Delta Phi.

== Early life ==
Leonard was born in Bridgewater, Massachusetts. His father was Lahum Kingman Leonard, a representative in the Massachusetts legislature, high school principal, and superintendent of the State Farm.

He attended Bridgewater State College in 1899, graduating in 1902. While in college, he was a member of the Normal Club. He was also at one time the president of the athletic association. On April 14, 1900, fourteen male students met and established Kappa Delta Phi. That day Leonard wrote in his diary, "Fourteen specimens of the genus homo, banded together by the sacred ties of fraternal brotherhood, met in [the] dining hall at 7:00 p.m. sharp…a number of [speeches] were made all expatiating on the desirability of perpetuating this secret band of brothers. Suffice it to be said, that an organization was effected [sic] which we hope may be as lasting as the university itself.” Leonard was elected as the fraternity's secretary and later served as treasurer and vice president.

== Career ==
After graduating from college, Leonard became the principal of Sanderson Academy in Ashfield, Massachusetts, from the fall of 1907 to June 1910. When he left Sanderson, he took to college studies at Harvard University.

He was then associated with the Keene Normal School in Keene, New Hampshire. In May 1921, he was hired as the Superintendent of Schools in North Andover, Massachusetts. He held that position until he resigned in 1927 due to poor health.

== Personal life ==
Leonard was married and had a son. He remained active in the Kappa Delta Phi fraternity and attended its annual conventions, which began at his suggestion. He also helped established the Gamma chapter. On June 21, 1902, he was chosen "Father of the Fraternity". In June 1904, he served on the committee of four members that explored whether or not Kappa Delta Phi should become a national fraternity.

Leonard had a summer home in Plymouth, Massachusetts. He died on September 11, 1927, in Plymouth from angina pectoris immediate cardio sclerosis. He was buried in the Mt. Prospect Cemetery in Bridgewater.

== Honors ==
At its 1929 convention, Kappa Delta Phi changed the name of its scholarship fund to the Nathum Leonard Loan Fund in his honor.
