= Naum Bozda =

Serbian merchant and philanthropist

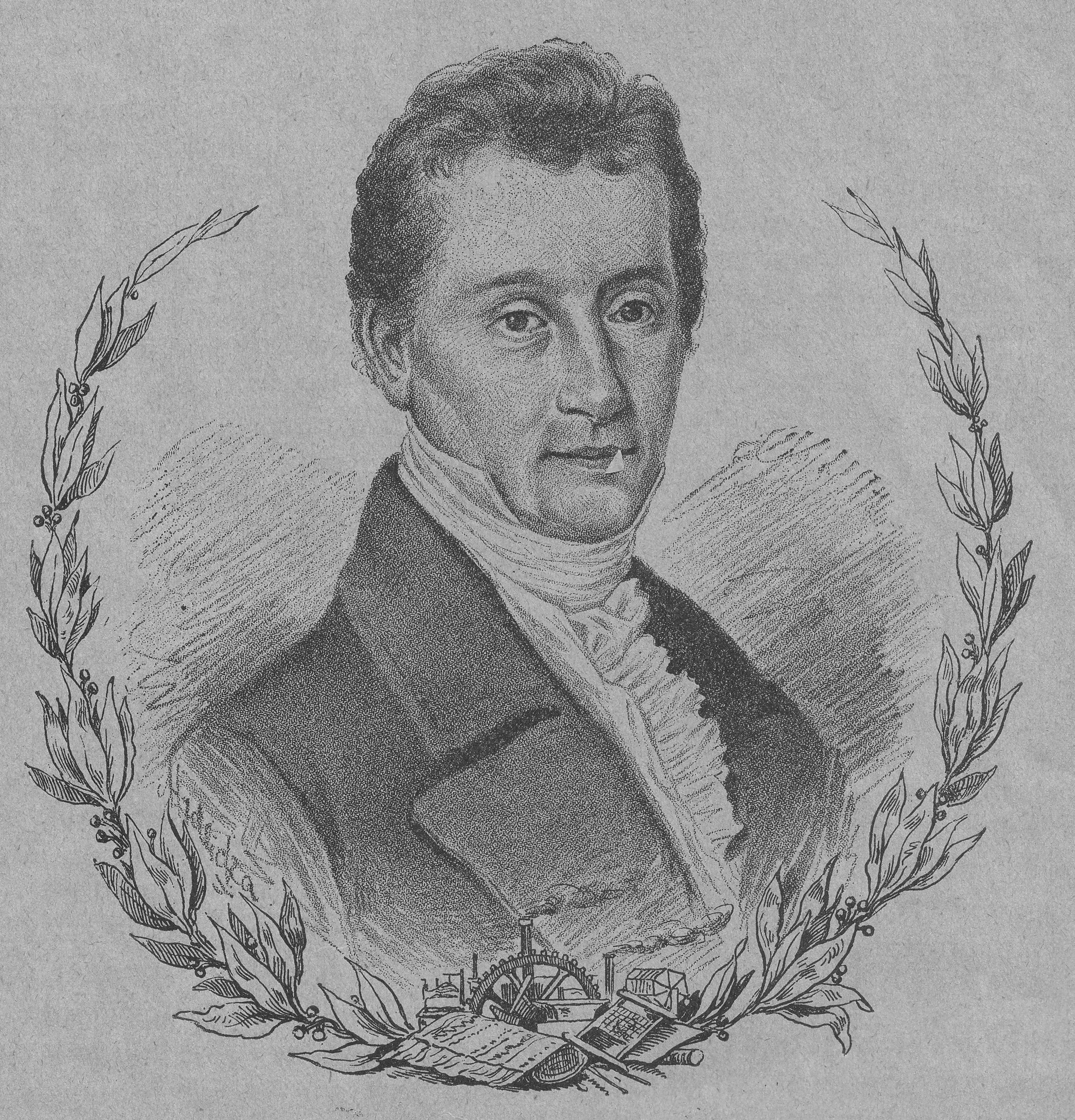
Naum Bozda

Naum Bozda (6 February 1784 – 25 May 1853) was a Serbian merchant and philanthropist.

== Biography ==
Father Mihailo and mother Aleksandra, originally from Macedonia, lived in the rich Orthodox church community of Balassagyarmat in Hungary. By origin, Bozdini were Cincars. Nahum had two brothers (John and George) and three sisters (Mary, Martha, and Anna).

== Trader ==
Having enriched himself with the salt trade, as a wholesaler from Balashajarmat, Bozda became a benefactor of the newly established People's School Fund in 1815 with a contribution of 100 forints, together with his brother Jovan, who contributed 500 forints.

He moved to Pest in 1818 and became a tenant of the pontoon bridge on the Danube until a chain bridge was built between Buda and Pest. He bought a house across the street from Tekelijanum and became a wealthy wholesaler. Thanks to business connections with the famous banking house of Baron Sina from Vienna, he almost doubled his fortune. He was an elected citizen of Pest and a member of the Directorate for the construction of a chain bridge.

== Matica Srpska ==
He was an active member and contributor of Matica Srpska (he bequeathed her 200 silver forints) from 1837 until the end of his life. He became treasurer of Matica in 1838 and performed this duty without compensation until 1847, as well as the treasurer of the Jovan Nak Foundation.

== Charity ==
He married twice, the second time (1817) Jelena, the daughter of Jovan Bjelanović, a senator from Sentandreja. Since they had no children, they founded the Naum and Jelena Bozda Endowment to support Serb craftsmen, to open a shop in Pest, and to graduate medical students to start a private practice. The foundation was managed by the Serbian Church Municipality in Pest. Jelena donated their home library to Matica.

Naum and Jelena Bozda were buried in the Kerepeši cemetery in Budapest.
