= Joseph Augustine Cushman =

American micropaleontologist (1881–1949)

- Born: January 31, 1881; Bridgewater, Massachusetts, U.S.
- Died: April 16, 1949 (aged 68); Sharon, Massachusetts, U.S.
- Burial place: Boston, Massachusetts
- Occupations: Foraminiferologist and academic
- Known for: Foraminifera, Their Classification and Economic Use and his system of discovering petroleum deposits

Academic background
- Education: Bridgewater Normal School; Harvard University
- Thesis: The Phylogeny of the Miliolidae (1909)

Academic work
- Discipline: Biology
- Sub-discipline: Micropaleontology
- Institutions: Harvard Museum of Natural History Cushman Laboratory for Foraminiferal Research; Harvard University United States Geological Survey

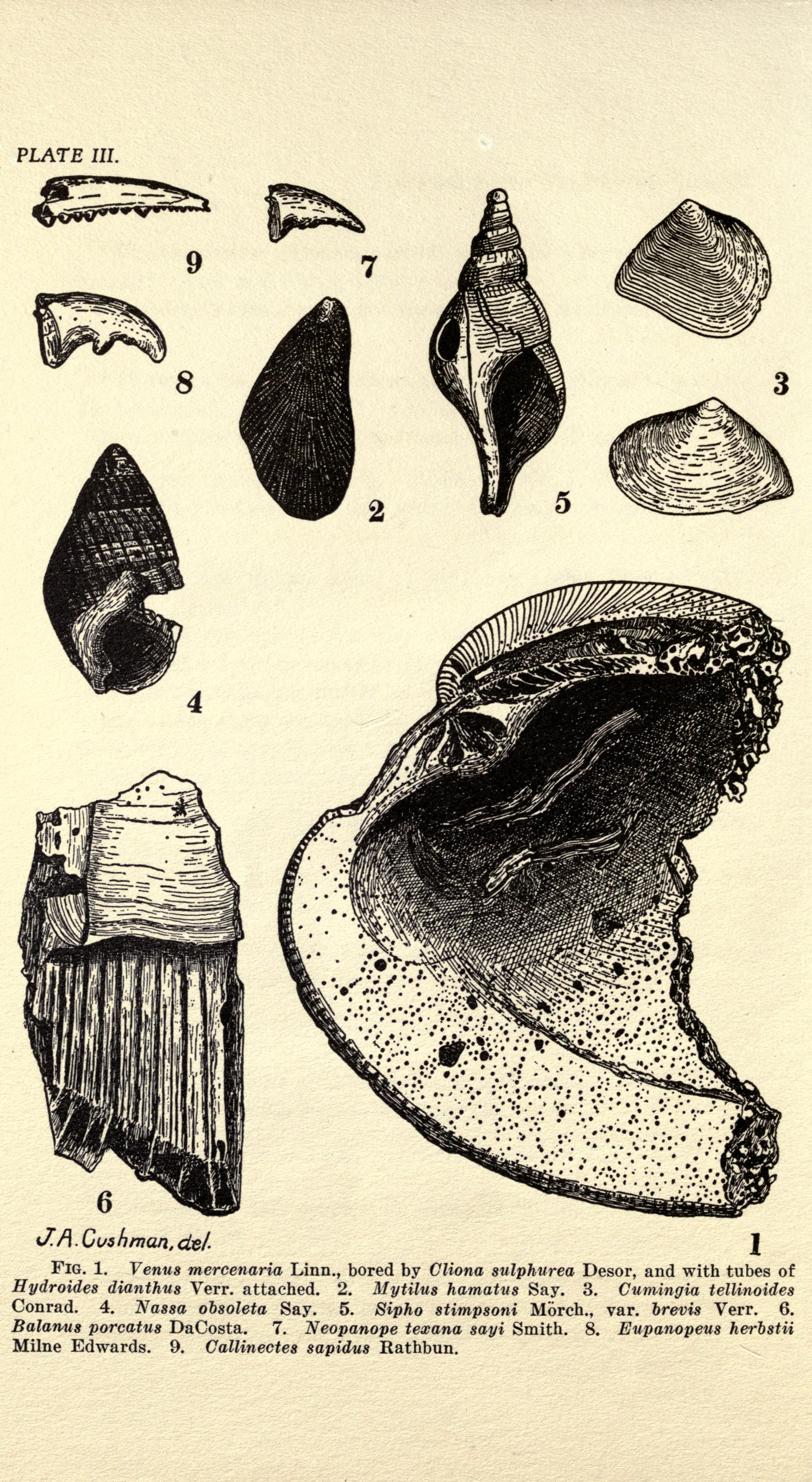
Diagram from one of Cushman's scientific articles, drawn by himself

Joseph Augustine Cushman (January 31, 1881 – April 16, 1949) was an American micropaleontologist and academic. He specialized in the study of marine protozoans (foraminifera) and became the foremost foraminiferologist of the first half of the twentieth century, developing to a "world-famous system of discovering petroleum deposits". He also was a founding father of Kappa Delta Phi fraternity.

== Early life ==
Cushman was born in Bridgewater, Massachusetts. His parents were Jane Frances (née Fuller and Pratt) and Darius Cushman; this was a second marriage for both. His father had a store in Bridgewater where he sold and repaired shoes. Cushman's ancestry went back to the Mayflower on both his maternal and paternal sides.

Cushman attended public schools, starting at the age of four. He went to Bridgewater High School when he was twelve and he graduated in 1897. He planned on studying medicine but this changed due to financial circumstances when his father died shortly after his graduation. He worked before and after school, while his mother took in borders from the local Bridgewater Normal School.

He attended Bridgewater Normal School, graduating in 1901. There he discovered his interest in science and took his first geology class. He was the captain and catcher for the baseball team and a fullback and the manager of the football team. He helped establish the Kappa Delta Phi fraternity in 1900 and served as its first president.

Later, he attended Harvard University, graduating in 1903 with a B.S. in Biology, magna cum laude. He was awarded a Ph.D. from Harvard in 1909. His dissertation was "The Phylogeny of the Miliolidae".

== Career ==
Cushman was a curator at the Boston Natural History Museum (now the Harvard Museum of Natural History), working part-time while he attended graduate school. He worked for the United States Geological Survey in 1912. He became the director of the Boston Natural History Museum from 1913 until his resignation in 1923.

Next to his home in Sharon, Massachusetts, he constructed a building that would become the Cushman Laboratory for Foraminiferal Research in 1923. In his laboratory, he conducted research, worked as a consultant for oil companies, and taught classes in micropaleontology to undergraduate and graduate students. He developed one of the finest collections of foraminifera in the world, with 62,000 cataloged slides.

He was a lecturer in micropaleontology and a research associate at Harvard University from 1926 to 1940. Also in 1926, he became a consultant for the U.S. Geological Survey on foraminifera. He was chairman of the National Research Council's Commission on Micropaleontology in 1930.

Cushman was a fellow in the American Academy of Arts and Science (Zoology and Physiology Division) a fellow in the American Geographical Society, and a fellow and vice president of the Geological Society of America. He was president of the Paleontological Society, president of the Economic Paleontologists and Mineralogists, and a member of the American Association of Petroleum Geologists.

During his career, Cushman published 554 scholarly papers. In 1925, he established the journal, Contributions from the Cushman Laboratory for Foraminiferal Research, which published many of his papers. He also edited the Journal of Paleontology from 1927 to 1930. His Foraminifera, Their Classification and Economic Use became a classic and standard textbook with multiple editions.

== Legacy ==
Cushman bequeathed his collections and library to the National Museum of Natural History, Smithsonian Institution.

In 1950, a group of scientists formed the Cushman Foundation for Foraminiferal Research, Inc. "to promote research on foraminifera and allied organisms". Following the tradition and continuing Contributions from the Cushman Laboratory for Foraminiferal Research which was published by Cushman, the foundation of It publishes the Journal of Foraminiferal Research (previously called Contributions from the Cushman Foundation for Foraminiferal Research).

== Awards and honors ==
- Cushman received an honorary Doctor of Science degree from Harvard University in 1937.
- He was an honorary fellow of the Royal Microscopical Society in 1938.
- He received the Hayden Memorial Geological Award from the Academy of Natural Sciences of Philadelphia in 1945.
- The Cushman Foundation for Foraminiferal Research, Inc. was named in his honor in 1950.
- The Dorsum Cushman wrinkle ridge on the Moon is named for him in 1976.
- The Joseph A. Cushman Award for Excellence in Foraminiferal Research was established in 1980 and is presented annually to living researchers who make outstanding contributions to foraminiferology.

== Personal life ==
Cushman married Alice Edna Wilson at her home Steep Brook in Fall River, Massachusetts on October 7, 1903. She was the daughter of James H. Wilson, a coal dealer. After their marriage, they lived in Boston but later moved to Sharon, Massachusetts. They had three children, Robert born in 1905, Alice in 1907, and Ruth in 1910. His wife died in January 1912.

In January 1913, Cushman's engagement to Frieda Gerlach Billings of Sharon was announced. and they were married on September 3. She was the daughter of physician Frank S. Billings, who was deceased. They lived in a newly built house on Crest Road in Sharon. He was a member of the Roxbury Unitarian Church.

In 1949, Cushman died of bladder cancer at his home in Sharon, Massachusetts. He was buried in Great Hills Cemetery in Boston, Massachusetts.

== Select publications ==
=== Books ===
- Foraminifera, Their Classification and Economic Use. Sharon, Massachusetts: Cushman Laboratory for Foraminiferal Research, 1928.

=== Monographs ===
- A Monograph of the Foraminifera of the North Pacific Ocean. Smithsonian Institution United States National Museum Bulletin vol. 71, 1913.
- Some Pliocene and Miocene Foraminifera of the Coastal Plain of the United States. U.S. Geological Survey Bulletin 646, 1918.
- The Foraminifera of the Atlantic Ocean Part 1: Astrorhizidae. Smithsonian Institution United States National Museum Bulletin 104, 1918.
- Foraminifera of the Philippine and Adjacent Seas. Smithsonian Institution United States National Museum Bulletin 100, vol. 4, 1921. ISBN 978-0-598-36912-3
- The Foraminifera of the Atlantic Ocean. Part E Textularidae. Smithsonian Institution United States National Museum Bulletin vol. 104, 1922
- Shallow-water Foraminifera of the Tortugas Region. Department of Marine Biology of the Carnegie Institution of Washington Publication 311, 1922. ISBN 978-0-598-36053-3
- Samoan Foraminifera. Department of Marine Biology of the Carnegie Institution of Washington Publication vol. 21, 1924. ISBN 978-0-598-34686-5 – via Google Books.
- Recent Foraminifera from Off the West Coast of America. Bulletin of the Scripps Institution of Oceanography Technical Series vol 1, no. 10, pp. 119–188, 1927
- A Monograph of the Foraminiferal Family Nonionidae. U.S. Geological Survey Professional Paper 191, 1939
- Geology and Biology of North Atlantic Deep-Sea Cores Between Newfoundland and Ireland U.S, Part 2: Foraminifera. with Lloyd G. Henbest. Geological Survey Professional Paper 196-A, 1940
- The Foraminifera of the Tropical Pacific Collections of the "Albatross," 1899–1900. Smithsonian Institution United States National Museum Bulletin 161, 1942
- Upper Cretaceous Foraminifera of the Gulf Coastal Region of the United States and Adjacent Areas. U.S Geological Survey Professional Paper 206. Washington, D.C., 1946.
- Paleocene Foraminifera of the Gulf Coastal Region of the United States and Adjacent Areas: Descriptions and Illustrations of Smaller Foraminifera from the Gulf Coastal Region, Cuba, Central America, Haiti, and Trinidad. U.S. Geological Survey Professional Paper 232, 1951

=== Journal articles ===
- "The Desmid Flora of Nantucket." Bulletin of the Torrey Botanical Club 32, no. 101 (1905): 549–53
- "Notes on the Zygospores of Certain New England Desmids with Descriptions of a Few New Forms." Bulletin of the Torrey Botanical Club 32, no. 4 (1905): 223–29
- "Some Desmids from Newfoundland." Bulletin of the Torrey Botanical Club 33, no. 12 (1906): 607–15
- "New England Desmids of the Sub-Family Saccodermae." Bulletin of the Torrey Botanical Club 33, no. 6 (1906): 343–51
- "A Synopsis of the New England Species of Tetmemorus." Bulletin of the Torrey Botanical Club 34, no. 12 (1907): 599–601
- "The New England Species of Closterium." Bulletin of the Torrey Botanical Club 35, no. 3 (1908): 109–134
- "Texas Jackson Foraminifera". with E. R. Applin. AAPG Bulletin 1926, 10, no. 2 (February 1, 1926): 154–189
- "Phylogenetic Studies of the Foraminifera, Part I", American Journal of Science April 1927, s5–13 (76) 315–326
