= Nayeem (name) =

- Pronunciation: /ˈnɑːʔiːm/
- Gender: Male

Origin
- Origin: Arabic, Hebrew
- Meaning: In Arabic: Happiness and comfort In Hebrew: Pleasant

Other names
- Related names: Naima, Noam, Naamah, Naomi, Hasan

Nayeem is a masculine given name and surname of Arabic origin. It is a variant spelling of the name Naim. Notable persons with the name include:

== Given name ==
- Nayeem (died 2016), Indian Naxalite leader
- Nayeem (actor) (born 1970), Bangladeshi film actor of the 1990s
- Mohammed Nayeem Hasan (born 2000), Bangladeshi cricketer
- Nayeemul Islam Khan (born 1960), Bangladeshi journalist

== Surname ==
=== Nayeem ===
- Nabiul Islam Nayeem, Bangladeshi cricketer

=== Nayeemuddin ===
- Syed Nayeemuddin (born 1944), Indian footballer and football coach
