= Hedwig Thusnelda Kniker =

American geologist and micropaleontologist

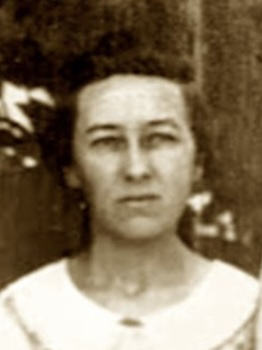
- Born: 11 November 1891; Gay Hill, Washington County, Texas
- Died: October 12, 1985; San Antonio, Texas
- Other name: H.T. Kniker
- Known for: Discovering importance of foraminifera in stratigraphy

Academic background
- Education: University of Texas at Austin

Academic work
- Discipline: Geologist and Micropaleontologist
- Institutions: Bureau of Economic Geology

Hedwig Thusnelda Kniker (November 13, 1891 – October 12, 1985) was an American geologist and micropaleontologist. Kniker, alongside fellow female geologists Alva Ellisor and Esther Applin, changed the landscape of oil well drilling in the United States by discovering the importance of foraminifera in stratigraphy.

== Biography ==
H.T. Kniker was born in 1891 in Gay Hill, Texas. After graduating as valedictorian from the Opera House School in New Braunfels in 1908 and becoming a teacher in Washington County, she began her studies at the University of Texas. There, she earned a B.A. in German, psychology and geology, graduating in 1916. The following year, she returned to the school to earn her M.A. alongside professor Francis Whitney, focusing on the subject of Cretaceous Bivalves. She graduated from the program in 1917. Her education continued in future years at Cornell University and the University of Chicago.

Kniker worked with Whitney at the Bureau of Economic Geology, a research branch of the Jackson School of Geosciences at her alma mater. She remained there until 1920 when she to work for a series of petroleum companies in the United States and Chile. Her work included the study of Cretaceous and Tertiary period well cuttings, as well as the study of Permian aged fusulinids and their stratigraphic significance.

One of her accomplishments that gave her huge recognition was for her efforts in establishing an oil field for the company Gulf Oil in Patagonia. She worked on this project for about 20 years.

In her work, she is often credited as H. T. Kniker, a moniker used in order to avoid the gender-based discrimination which was prevalent in her field of work at the time.

She retired in Seguin, Texas, in 1950, moving to San Antonio twenty years later. Kniker died at 94 years of age on October 12, 1985.

== Significant discovery ==
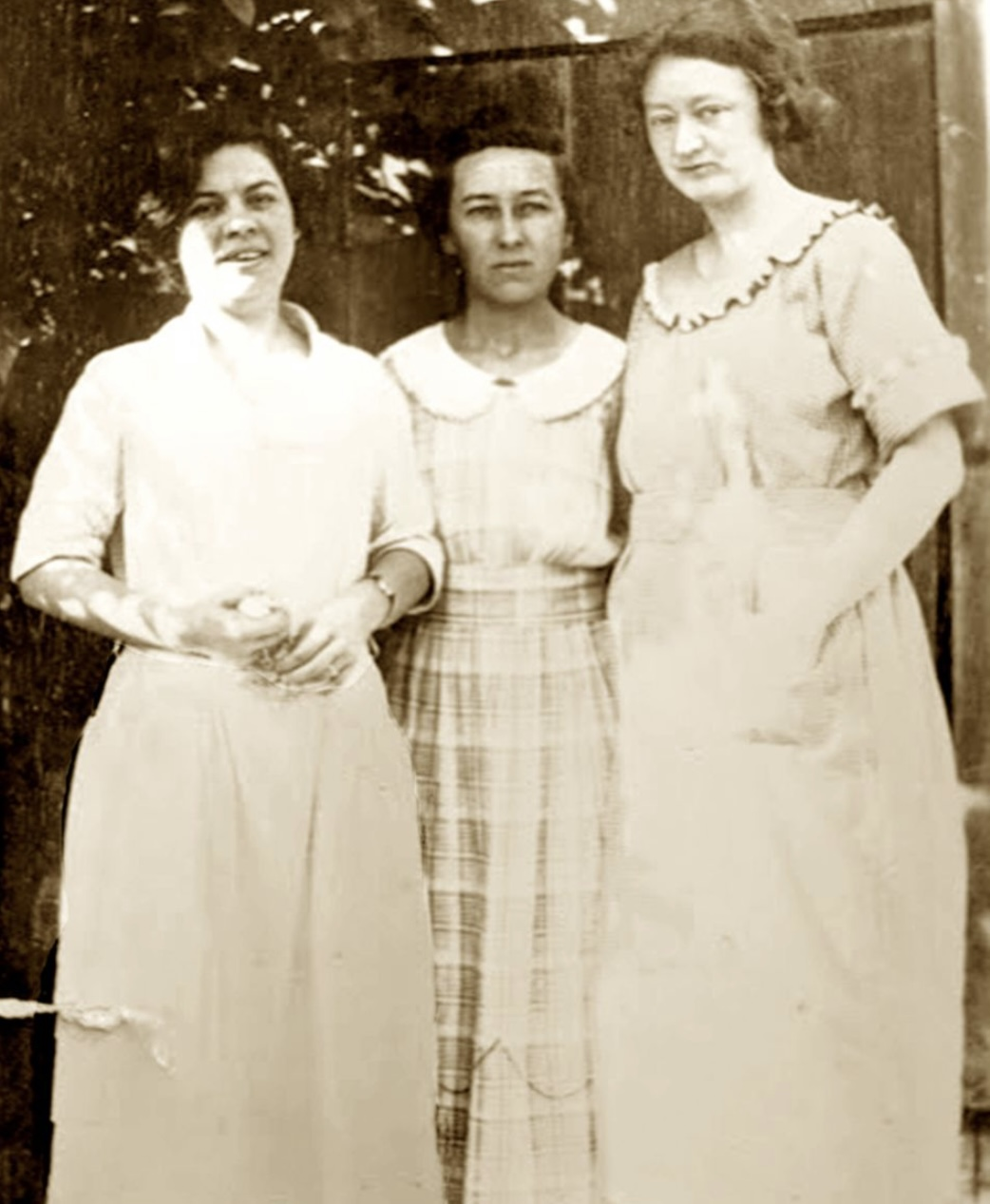
(L-R) Alva Ellisor, Kniker and Esther Applin

Hedwig Kniker along with Alva Ellisor, and Esther Applin, worked together to transform oil exploration to an economic affair. They achieved this through discovering the functionality of foraminifera in biostratigraphy.

In the 1920s, Kniker and her colleagues, Applin and Ellisor, were given macrofossil samples by their company to study. These samples were too damaged to be considered useful in macrofossil study, but the microfossils were almost entirely intact. The most well-maintained of these specimens were the foraminifera. However, the majority of micropaleontologists at the time did not believe that the single-celled organisms were diverse enough to have any practical applications and had therefore been ignored. Together, the women discovered that the species actually provided very detailed stratigraphic correlations and were incredibly useful in their field. Over the years this discovery was claimed by the men who had dismissed them and has been attributed to several different men since.

== Legacy ==
After her death on 12 October 1985, Kniker’s estate funded the addition of 39 bells to the University of Texas’ carillon. Following the completion of the project in 1987, the building was renamed the Kniker Carillon, in her honour. The carillon celebrates Kniker as one of the first female graduates in geology from the University of Texas.

A portion of the specimens that Kniker collected throughout her lifetime are contained within the Non-vertebrate Paleontology Laboratory’s Type Collection at the Jackson School Museum of Earth History, a division of the University of Texas.
