= Nahum Cohen =

Russian writer and journalist

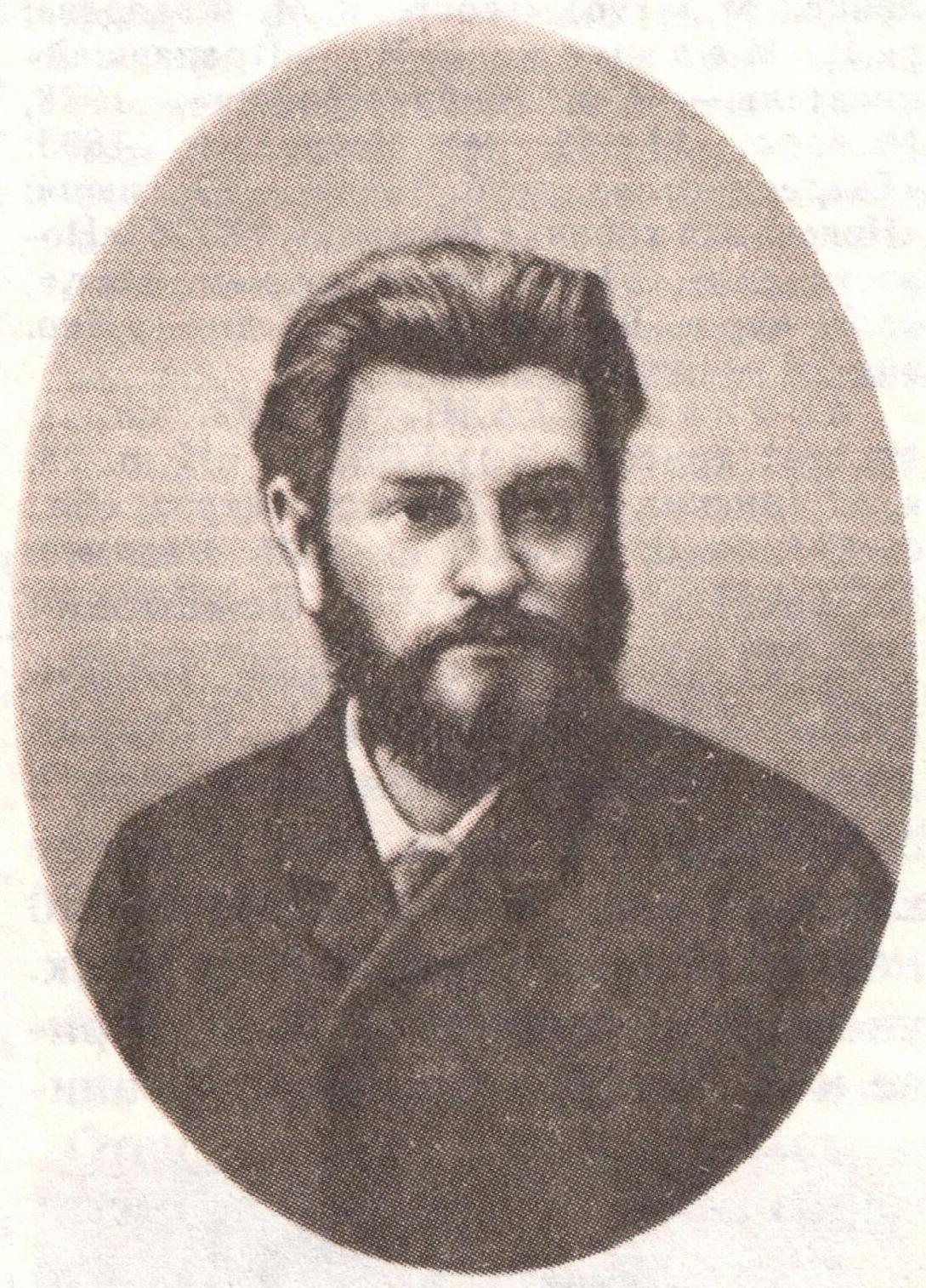
- Born: August 23, 1863
- Died: January 27, 1893 (aged 29); Yekaterinoslav, Yekaterinoslav Governorate, Russian Empire
- Writing career
- Pen name: Naumov

Nahum Cohen (Russian: Наум Коган, Hebrew: נחום כהן; August 23, 1863 – January 27, 1893), also known by the pseudonym Naumov (Наумов), was a Russian writer and journalist.

== Biography ==
Nahum Cohen was raised in Nikopol where he attended the local kheder, afterwards studying at the gymnasium in Kherson. He then pursued studies at the Kharkov Veterinary Institute, but left after falling ill with a nervous system disorder and being admitted to a psychiatric hospital. Upon his release, he briefly returned to his hometown and established a school there.

His health continued to deteriorate, resulting in a lung disease. In 1888 he relocated to Crimea, where he worked as a private teacher and contributed to various local periodicals, especially to the Krym and Krymski Vyestnik. His acclaimed ghetto story, V Glukhom Myestechkye ('In a Dull Townlet'), published first in Vestnik Evropy (November 1892), would later appear also in book form (Moscow, 1895).

He died in Yekaterinoslav in 1893 at the age of 29.
