= Benjamín Nahum =

Uruguayan historian, professor, and researcher

- Born: 2 February 1937 (age 89); Montevideo, Uruguay
- Education: Instituto de Profesores Artigas
- Occupations: professor, historian, researcher
- Children: Ana

Benjamín Nahum (born 2 February 1937) is a Uruguayan historian, professor, and researcher.

He is professor of Economic History at the University of the Republic, in Montevideo, the oldest and largest university in the country, as well as the second largest public university in South America

In 1979 he was awarded the Guggenheim Fellowship.

His daughter was television journalist and writer Ana Nahum.

== Works ==
- Escritos de Historia Económica y Documental (13 vol.)
- Manual de Historia del Uruguay (1830–1990)
- Series de documentos de diplomáticos extranjeros (27 vol.)
- Bases económicas de la Revolución Artiguista (1964, with José Pedro Barrán)
- Historia social de las revoluciones de 1897 y 1904 (1967, with José Pedro Barrán))
- Historia Rural del Uruguay Moderno, 7 vols. (1967–1978, with José Pedro Barrán)
- Batlle, los estancieros y el Imperio Británico, 8 vols. (1979–1987, with José Pedro Barrán)
- "Historia Uruguaya", Ediciones de la Banda Oriental:
  - vol. 6: La época batllista, 1905–1929 (1975)
  - editor of vol. 7: Crisis política y recuperación económica, 1930–1958 (1988)
  - editor of vol. 8: El fin del Uruguay liberal, 1959–1973, (1990)
- La evolución de la deuda externa del Uruguay: 1875–1939 (1995)
- La crisis de 1890 (1998)
- Breve historia del Uruguay independiente (1999)
- Colección El Uruguay del siglo XX (recopilador y editor) (2001)
