= Kappa Delta Phi (fraternity) =

North American collegiate fraternity

- ΚΔΦ
- Founded: April 14, 1900; 126 years ago Bridgewater State Normal School
- Type: Social
- Affiliation: NIC
- Status: Active
- Scope: National
- Motto: "May The Spirit Never Die"
- Colors: Black and Gold
- Flower: Yellow Rose
- Mascot: Ernie T. Krow
- Publication: KappaTalk
- Philanthropy: Home for Our Troops (HFOT)
- Chapters: 34, 9 active
- Members: 9,000 active
- Headquarters: P.O. Box 865; Bridgewater, Massachusetts 02324; United States
- Website: www.kappadeltaphi.org

Kappa Delta Phi (ΚΔΦ), also known as KDPhi, is a social fraternity that was founded on April 14, 1900, at the Bridgewater State Normal School, now known as Bridgewater State University. The fraternity currently boasts nine active chapters. A sorority, Kappa Delta Phi National Affiliated Sorority or NAS, was formed in 1971, and remains closely affiliated with the fraternity.

== Mission statement ==
The purpose of this fraternity shall be to bring together males of good character who are studying in institutions of higher education and who manifest a keen interest in higher education; to promote the highest ideals and educational practices; to promote a spirit of good citizenship and to seek change in our institution only through duly constituted authority; to actively support the fight against discrimination on the basis of race, color, or creed; and to strengthen and preserve the bonds of brotherhood which link men together working toward a common cause.

== Founding fathers ==
Cyrus M. Benson
Cyrus M. Benson was born in Bridgewater, Massachusetts, on May 21, 1878. In his career at Bridgewater, he was running back and captain of the football team. He was also secretary and treasurer of section C, of his graduating class and a member of the glee club as well as one time Vice-President of Kappa Delta Phi. He graduated from Bridgewater in 1900. One of his jobs was manager of Norfolk hosiery and underwear Mills Company, in New York. Cyrus M Benson died in Boston MA in July 1949.
Louis D. Cook
Louis DeLaitre Cook was born in Ellsworth, Maine, on June 22, 1879. While attending Bridgewater, he was a substitute for the football team. After graduating from Bridgewater in 1901, he became principal of a grammar school in New Bedford, Massachusetts.
Edward L. Curran
Edward Lawrence Curran was born on February 14, 1879, in East Bridgewater, Massachusetts. While attending Bridgewater, he was the manager of the baseball team and left tackle on the football team. He was also the Vice-President of Bridgewater’s athletic association and class historian of section C for his graduating class. Also as a member of Kappa Delta Phi, he served as Vice-President. After graduating from Bridgewater in 1901, he went on to earn his Ph.D. Soon after this he became superintendent of Boston Newboy's Club. Also during his post graduate career, he taught at the School of Sciences at Fordham University as well as being the sales manager at American Oil Company in Boston. Later on in his career he moved to New York City where he became a registrar at the Woolworth Building. After living in New York for his last few years of work, he moved back to Boston where he retired. Edward Curran died on January 5, 1957. He was buried in the St. Thomas Aquinas Cemetery in Bridgewater.
Sumner W. Cushing
Sumner Webster Cushing was born in Ridge Hills (South Hingham), Massachusetts. During his time at Bridgewater, he was a member of the Normal Club as well as the team manager for the football team. He also was president of section B of his graduating class. As a member of Kappa Delta Phi, he served as vice-president and also served on the executive committee. Upon graduating from Bridgewater in 1902, he went on to Harvard and Brown A.M. After receiving his masters he became an instructor at the Normal School in Salem, Massachusetts (now Salem State College), where he went on to become the head of the geography department and taught for eleven years. Sumner Cushing died on February 28, 1920. He was buried in Harmony Grove, Salem.
Joseph A. Cushman
Joseph Augustine Cushman was born on January 31, 1881 in Bridgewater. He was the captain and catcher for the baseball team along with fullback and manager for the football team. He graduated in 1901 from Bridgewater. He was the assistant curator at the Museum of Natural History in Boston as well as a geologist for the U.S government. Joseph Cushman died on April 16, 1949 and is buried in Great Hills Cemetery, Boston.
Herman Gammons
Herman Gammons was born on May 14, 1880 in Bridgewater. He played 4 years of baseball as a first baseman, as well as a member of the glee club. He was the 1st Vice-President and Secretary of Kappa Delta Phi along with president of section C in his graduating class. After graduating from Bridgewater in 1901, he went on to Harvard where he attained his masters in teaching. After Harvard he became a high school principal in Ashby. Later in his career he became principal for a high school in Lewiston, Maine. In his free time he enjoyed fishing and woodcrafts. On June 21, 1971, Herman Gammons died at Nobel Hospital in Westfield. He was cremated in Springfield, and his ashes were buried in Lake Grove Cemetery, Holliston, Massachusetts. He was the last of the fraternity's founding fathers to die.
Arthur L. Gould
Arthur L. Gould was born in Rockland, Massachusetts, on December 19, 1879. During his college career, he served on the Executive Board and was Vice-President of Kappa Delta Phi. He was a pitcher on the baseball team as well as quarterback and left end for the football team. Also, he was president of section A of his graduating class. He graduated from Bridgewater in 1900. He became assistant superintendent of public schools of Boston and eventually became superintendent. He also at one time was principal at the Renfrew School in Adams, Massachusetts, as well as the sub master at the Martin School in Rockland. Arthur Gould died on October 17, 1956 and was buried in a family plot in the St. Patrick Cemetery in his hometown of Rockland.
William R. Kramer
William Robert Kramer was born in Clinton, Massachusetts, on October 6, 1879. As a member of Kappa Delta Phi, he served as Vice-President. He was Business Manager of the yearbook as well as Vice-President of the athletic association. In 1900, he graduated from Bridgewater. He was sub master at the Hugh O’Brien School in Roxbury, Massachusetts, as well as schoolmaster of Boston Public Schools. William Kramer died on September 15, 1940 and was buried in a family plot at the Woodlawn Cemetery in Clinton.
Nahum Leonard
Nahum Leonard was born on December 11, 1876, in Bridgewater. While he attended Bridgewater, he was a member of the Normal Club. He was also at one time the president of the athletic association and chairman on the social committee for the normal club. As a member of Kappa Delta Phi, he served on the Executive Committee, Advisory Council and as Vice-President. After graduating from Bridgewater in 1902, he went on to be principal of Sanderson Academy in Ashfield, Massachusetts. He was superintendent of Schools in North Andover, Massachusetts, when he died on September 11, 1927, and was buried in the Mt. Prospect Cemetery in Bridgewater. He is known as the "father", or the "honorable big big brother" of the fraternity.
Alfred K. Lowe
Alfred Kingsbury Lowe was born on October 28, 1877, in Worcester, Massachusetts. He served on the Executive Committee and as Vice-President of Kappa Delta Phi. His year of graduation from Bridgewater was 1900. He was the principal of the Renfrew School in Adams, Massachusetts. Alfred Lowe died on March 6, 1930, and is buried in West Boylston, Massachusetts.
Leon E. Maglathlin
Leon Edward Maglathlin was born on April 8, 1880, in Duxbury, Massachusetts. During his time at Bridgewater, he was captain of the baseball team and played 4 years of football as the quarterback. He was also the editor of the 1900 Normal School Offering (year book). He was the first president and Vice-President of Kappa Delta Phi. After graduating from Bridgewater in 1900, he went on to Harvard. He became a mill manager in Springfield, Massachusetts. Leon Maglathlin was buried in Kingston, Massachusetts.
Louis T. Morse
Louis Theodore Morse was born on July 9, 1874, in Boston. He was the first treasurer of Kappa Delta Phi. After graduating from Bridgewater in 1900, he moved to New York City and eventually ended up in West Somerville, Massachusetts. Louis Morse died on January 30, 1920, and is buried in the Shawsheen Cemetery in Bedford, Massachusetts.
William E. Smith
William Everett Smith was born on July 26, 1876, in Marblehead, Massachusetts. While a member of Kappa Delta Phi, he served on the Executive Committee and as President. He was Assistant Business Manager to the yearbook and a member of the Normal Club serving as treasurer of the literary committee. He also was one time president of the tennis club and Athletic Association as well as the glee club. He graduated from Bridgewater in 1902. During his career he was head master at English High School in Boston. William Smith died on January 23, 1943 and is buried in the Waterside Cemetery in Marblehead.
Henry M. Vaughan
Henry Melbourne Vaughan was born in Berwick, Nova Scotia, on March 27, 1874. While attending Bridgewater, he played on the tennis team. He graduated from Bridgewater in 1900. He was a teacher in Auburn, Rhode Island, and Millbury, Massachusetts. Henry Vaughan died on May 30, 1939, and is buried in the Pocasset Cemetery in Cranston, Rhode Island.

== Timeline ==
Milestones from the national website include:

April 14, 1900

- Kappa Delta Phi is founded at the Bridgewater Normal School in room #60 of the Normal School Building.

1901

- Official badge is adopted

1902

- Nahum Leonard is named "Father of the Fraternity"

1904

- Fraternity Grip is adopted

1906

- First Convention is held at Young's Hotel, Boston, Massachusetts

1909

- Black and gold colors are adopted

1911

- Scholarship Cup is adopted

1914

- General Fraternity is established with 36 active members

1929

- Kappa Delta Phi becomes National Fraternity

1930

- President's Cup is adopted

1940

- Coat of Arms is adopted

1947

- Official Key is adopted

1949

- National Relations Award is adopted

1959

- Philanthropy Award is adopted

1962

- Display Award adopted

1966

- National Emblem, the crow, adopted

1967

- National Flower, the yellow rose, adopted

1968

- National Fraternity reorganized

1969

- New National Constitution adopted
- Edward F. Webber Scholarship Award adopted
- Nahum Leonard Scholarship adopted
- Senior Scholarship adopted
- The Golden Key published

=== 1971 ===
- Sorority founded in Bangor, Maine, at Husson University with the help of the Lambda chapter

1978

- Summer Workshops for Chapters established

1983

- Distinguished Service Award Scholarship adopted

1985

- Outstanding Chapter Award adopted
- Outstanding Leadership Award adopted

1986

- National Rushing and Pledging Manual established

1989

- National Alumni Association is incorporated

1990

- Kappa Delta Phi joins the North American Interfraternity Conference

1993

- Alpha Stone is dedicated
- Paul G. Collette Award for Excellence is adopted

== Chapters ==
Kappa Delta Phi has chartered 34 chapters, of which 9 are active.

== See also ==
- List of social fraternities and sororities
