= Naum Terebinsky =

Student of the theological seminary, a doctor of medicine, among other occupations

Naum Terebinsky Russian: Наум Теребинский
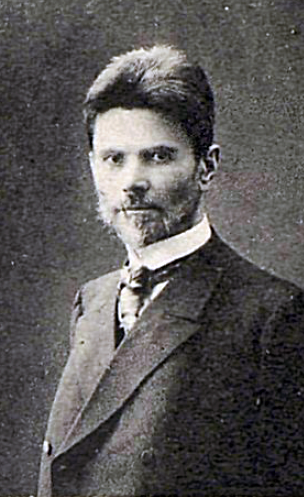
- in 1910

Deputy of the Third Imperial Duma
- In office 1 November 1907 – 18 March 1908
- Monarch: Nicholas II

Personal details
- Born: Naum Varlaamovich Terebinsky; 1851 Orenburg Governorate, Russian Empire
- Died: after 1908
- Party: Union of October 17

Naum Varlaamovich Terebinsky (variant of the patronymic name — Varlamovich; Russian: Наум Варлаамович Теребинский; 1 December 1851 — after 1908) was a student of the theological seminary, a doctor of medicine, a deputy Orenburg City Duma, a deputy of the Third Imperial Duma from the Orenburg Governorate from 1907 to 1908. His son was Nikolai Naumovich Terebinsky (Russian: Николай Наумович Теребинский, 1880—1959), a professor, one of the pioneers of open heart surgery.

== Literature ==
- Теребинский Наум Варлаамович (in Russian) // Государственная дума Российской империи: 1906—1917 / Б. Ю. Иванов, А. А. Комзолова, И. С. Ряховская. — Москва: РОССПЭН, 2008. — P. 608. — 735 p. — ISBN 978-5-8243-1031-3.
- Теребинскій (in Russian) // Члены Государственной Думы (портреты и биографии). Третий созыв. 1907—1912 гг. / Сост. М. М. Боиович. — Москва, 1913. — P. 210. — 526 p. (in Russian)
- Сафонов Д. А. Теребинский, Наум Варламович (in Russian) // Башкирская энциклопедия. — Уфа: ГАУН «Башкирская энциклопедия», 2013. — ISBN 978-5-88185-306-8.
