= Nahum Olin =

Mexican racing driver (born 1957)

Nahum Olin Sr. (born 16 August 1957) is a Mexican race car driver and team owner from Mexico City. He was champion of the 2001 Mexican Super Touring Championship. He has won championships as team owner in the 2003 and 2004 Clio Cup Mexico Series. He currently is a team owner in the Desafio Corona Series.
