= Naum Il'ich Feldman =

Soviet mathematician (1918–1994)

- Born: November 26, 1918; Melitopol, Ukraine
- Died: April 20, 1994 (aged 75)
- Citizenship: Russian
- Education: University of Leningrad
- Known for: Number theory
- Scientific career
- Fields: Mathematician

Naum Il'ich Feldman (26 November 1918 – 20 April 1994) was a Soviet mathematician who specialized in number theory.

== Life ==
Feldman was born on 26 November 1918 in Melitopol, Zaporizhia Oblast of southeastern Ukraine.

He entered in 1936 the Faculty of Mathematics and Mechanics at the University of Leningrad where he specialized in number theory under the supervision of Rodion O. Kuzmin. After his graduation in 1941, Feldman was called up by the army and served from October 1941 until the end of the World war II. For his service, he was awarded the Order of the Red Star, the Order of the Patriotic War (second class), and the medals "For the Capture of Königsberg", "For the Defence of Moscow", Medal "For the Victory over Germany in the Great Patriotic War 1941–1945".

After his demobilization, he started his PhD in 1946 at the Institute of Mathematics at the University of Moscow, under the supervision of Alexander O. Gelfond, and he presented his Ph.D. thesis in 1949. In 1950, he became head of the Department of Mathematics of the Ufimsky Oil Institute, where he was assigned until 1954. He lectured at the Moscow Geological Prospecting Institute from 1954 to 1961.

From September 1961 Feldman worked at Moscow State University, first in the department of mathematical analysis, and then in the department of number theory. In 1974 he became Doctor of Science. Feldman got full professorship in 1980.

Feldman died on 20 April 1994.

== Work ==
Feldman obtained important results in number theory. His main research area were the theory of Diophantine approximations, the theory of transcendental numbers, and Diophantine equations.

In 1899, French mathematician Émile Borel strengthened the famous theorem of Charles Hermite that proved in 1873 the transcendence of the number e without having been specifically constructed for this purpose. Later different estimates of the measure of transcendence were considered for other numbers too. Feldman's mentor Gelfond obtained his most famous result in 1948 in his eponymous theorem, also known as the 7th Hilbert's problem:

If α and β are algebraic numbers (with α≠0 and α≠1), and if β is not a real rational number, then any value of α^{β} is a transcendental number.

In 1949, Feldman further improved Gelfond's method to estimate of the measure of transcendence for logarithms of algebraic numbers and periods of elliptic curves. Of special importance is his result from 1960 on the measure of the transcendence of the number $\pi$.

== Bibliography ==
- "List of publications of Naum Il'ich Feldman". www.mathnet.ru.
- "Naum Il'ich Feldman". www-history.mcs.st-andrews.ac.uk.
- Naum Il'ich Feldman at zbMATH
