= Nachum Shifren =

American rabbi and surfer (born c. 1951)

Rabbi Nachum Shifren (Hebrew: נחום שיפרן; born c. 1951), also known as the "Surfing Rabbi," is an Orthodox Lubavitcher Chassidic rabbi, published author and surfer.

== Biography ==
A native of southern California, Shifren grew up in the San Fernando Valley, where he learned to surf as a youth. He worked as a lifeguard in Malibu as a young man, a time in his life when he was not religious. It was there that he met his mentor, Baywatch rescue boat skipper, Tommy Zahn. Shifren credits Zahn with instilling in him an "ethos of toughness and hard work, as well as a passion for competitive paddle boarding." Schifren has since completed the 32 mile Catalina Classic Paddle board race three times. He began his path to religiosity when he met an Australian rabbi who liked to bodysurf and performed sacraments at the beach.

Shifren received a Bachelor of Arts degree from the University of California, Santa Barbara in Spanish and German Literature. He continued graduate studies in West Germany at the University of Göttingen. Shifren is fluent in English, Spanish, German, Hebrew, and Yiddish. He attended Toras Chayim Yeshiva in Jerusalem and Yeshivat Tomchei Tmimim in Kfar Chabad, Israel, where in 1990 he was ordained to the rabbinate.

When he returned to the United States, Shifren worked as a teacher in the Los Angeles Unified School District where he taught Spanish language and literature.

Numerous print and broadcast media have done stories about Shifren and his "Surfing Rabbi" persona. He founded Jewish Surfers International and the Surf & Soul newsletter. He frequently uses surfing imagery to make religious points. "There's no way a skier can get the same connection with the Creator," Shifren told Salon in 1999. "The ocean is the first act of creation, while snow is not an act of creation. Skiers don't have the mountain chasing them, but the mountain of a wave chases surfers. They struggle against currents as they ride waves that have been around since time immemorial."

He leads annual "Kosher Surf Camp" trips to Costa Rica. He has written two books, Surfing Rabbi: A Kabbalistic Quest for Soul and Surfers Who Don't Surf.

== Politics ==
Rabbi Shifren has had links to groups in Europe such as the English Defence League (EDL), and has been described as a counter-jihadist. He traveled to England in December 2010 to support an EDL demonstration, which protested against Islamic fundamentalism.

In October 2010, he traveled to England to speak at an EDL rally. In his speech, he said that "[h]istory will be recorded that on this day, read by our children for eternity, one group lit the spark to liberate us from the oppressors of our two governments and the leftist, fifth column, quisling press, and that it was the EDL which started the liberation of England from evil."

Also in 2010, Shifren penned an article that referred to student protesters as "the front line of an army of Muslims that is waiting patiently to take over and subvert our country," called the students "terrorists-in-training" and announced, "we are at war with radical Islam."

In November 2017, following an incident in which right-wing protesters were blocked from entering Chicano Park by community activists, Shifren spoke at a San Diego City Council meeting, accusing the city council of ignoring the protesters' statements because they were white.

In March 1993, Shifren created turmoil at a conference of rabbis attended by Rev. Jesse Jackson. Shifren shouted out to Jackson, "If you were white, you would be considered a Nazi!", in reference to comments the Reverend delivered which had been considered by members of the Jewish community to be antisemitic. It then took five rabbis to remove Shifren from the convention.
