= Perrine Simon-Nahum =

French historian

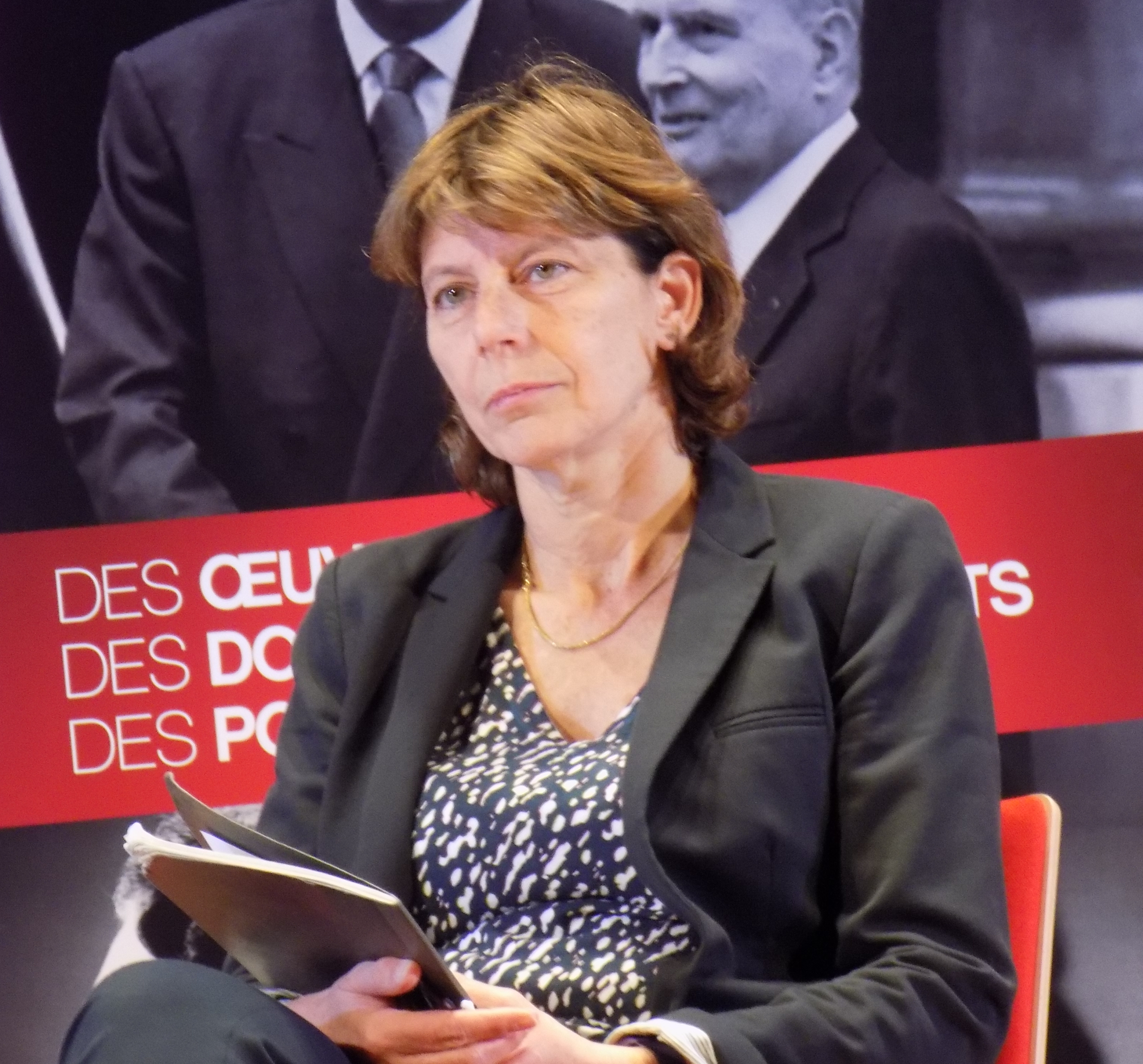
Perrine Simon-Nahum at the forum L’année vue par l’histoire organized by France Culture on 25 March 2017

Perrine Simon-Nahum (born in 1960) is a contemporary French historian.

== Biography ==
She is the daughter of Pr Pierre Simon.

Holder of a doctorate in history (1989), Simon-Nahum is responsible for research at the CNRS (Centre de recherches historiques of the EHESS, Centre d'Approaches Historiques du Monde contemporain) and associate member of the CRIA-EHESS. Specializing in contemporary history, her research focuses on Judaism and the history of Jews in France.

In 1989, she published a compilation of texts by Raymond Aron entitled Essais sur la condition juive contemporaine (reissued in 2007). She codirected a Dictionnaire critique de la République in 2002. At the same time, she is director of series at Éditions Grasset.

== Publications ==
- (éd.), Choice of texts and annotation of Raymond Aron, Essais sur la condition juive contemporaine, Paris, Éditions de Fallois, 1989. ISBN 2-87706-021-7; reissued 2007. ISBN 978-2-84734-444-8
- La cité investie. La science du judaïsme français et la République, Paris, Éditions du Cerf, "Bibliothèque franco-allemande", 1992. ISBN 2-204-04405-9
- (ed.), Les ombres de l'histoire. Crime et châtiment au XIXe siècle, texts collected by Michelle Perrot, Paris, Flammarion, 2001. ISBN 2-08-067914-7 ; reissued 2003. ISBN 2-08-080059-0
- (ed.) with Vincent Duclert and Christophe Prochasson, Dictionnaire critique de la République, Paris, Flammarion, 2002. ISBN 2-08-068059-5
- (ed.) with Vincent Duclert and Christophe Prochasson, Il s'est passé quelque chose le 21 avril 2002, Paris, Éditions Denoël, « Médiations », 2003. ISBN 2-207-25473-9
- (ed.), with Vincent Duclert, L'affaire Dreyfus: les événements fondateurs, Paris: A. Colin, 2009. (ISBN 978-2-200-24416-3).
- André Malraux: L'engagement politique au XXe siècle, Paris, Armand Colin, 2010. ISBN 978-2-200-24606-8
- Les Juifs et la modernité: l'héritage du judaïsme et les sciences de l'homme en France au XIXe siècle, Paris: Albin Michel, 2018. (ISBN 978-2-226-43915-4).
