= Esther Applin =

American petroleum geologist (1895–1972)

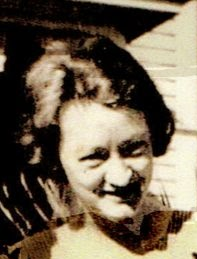
- Applin in 1927
- Born: Esther Richards; November 24, 1895; Newark, Ohio, U.S.
- Died: July 23, 1972 (aged 76)
- Education: University of California, Berkeley
- Occupation: Geologist
- Known for: Use of microfossils in oil exploration in the Gulf Coast
- Spouse: Paul Applin
- Children: 2

Esther Applin (née Richards; November 24, 1895 – July 23, 1972) was an American geologist and paleontologist. She completed her undergraduate degree in 1919 from the University of California, Berkeley. Later, she completed a master's degree which was focused on microfossils. She was a leading figure in the use of microfossils to determine the age of rock formation for use in oil exploration in the Gulf of Mexico region. Her job was to examine microfossils collected in drill holes (especially foraminifera) to determine the age of the rock into which the company was drilling. Applin's discoveries were crucial to successful drilling operations across the entire oil industry. Additionally, her contribution to geology and the study of micropaleontology was pivotal in earning women geologists respect in the field.

== Early life and education ==
Applin was born as Esther Richards on November 24, 1895, in Newark, Ohio, to Gary Richards, a civil engineer with the United States Army, and Jennie DeVore. Because of her father's work, she lived in various cities in Ohio, then later lived in Fort Des Moines, Iowa, and eventually moved to San Francisco at the age of 12. Richards lived on Alcatraz Island with her family from 1907 until 1920, while her father worked on the construction of Alcatraz Prison. From the island, she traveled to school (high school and later university) via the ferry.

Richards attended the University of California, Berkeley, graduating in 1919 with an honors degree in paleontology, geology, and physiography. In 1920, she left California and moved to Houston to work for the Rio Bravo Oil company, where she was hired by Edwin T. Dumble. While at Berkeley, Richards focused her studies on larger fossils; however, this theoretical education proved to be of little value for underground drilling because remnants of the fossils in drill cuttings were too small to effectively identify. She determined that the microfossils found in the drill cuttings could be useful in the correlation of underground rock formations. She then returned to California and studied micropaleontology, earning her master's degree.

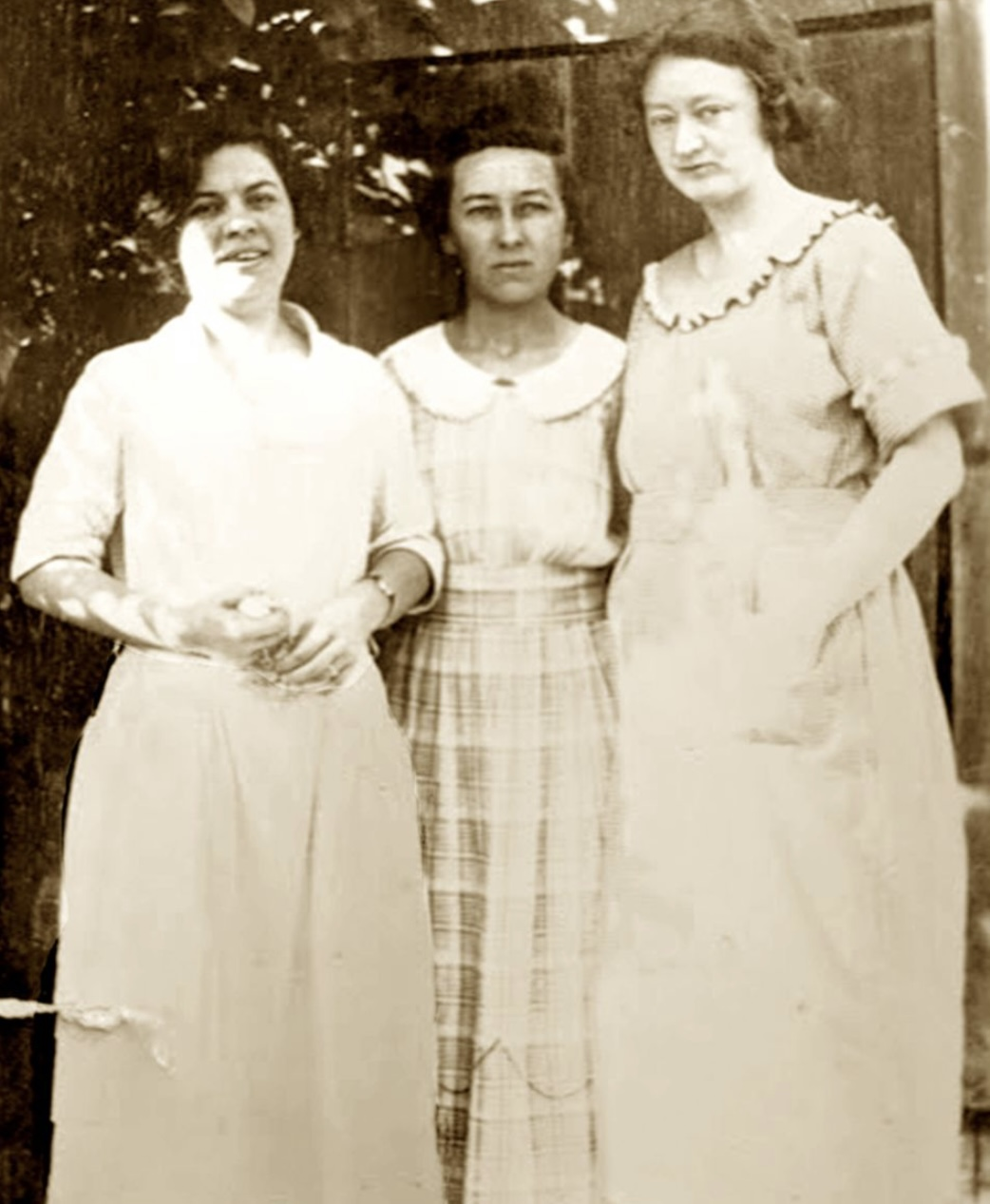
The three women (L-R: Alva Ellisor, Hedwig Kniker, and Esther Applin) shared an apartment in downtown Houston, and shared their research progress with each other as encouraged by their companies

In 1923, Edwin T. Dumble frequently assigned Esther Richards to work in outdoor fields with Paul Applin, a bachelor field geologist. Their relationship developed, and they were married later that year. She had two children: a daughter, Louise (born in 1926), and a son, Paul Jr. (born in 1927).

== Career and achievements ==
In 1921, Applin presented a paper in Amherst, Massachusetts, stating her theory that microfossils could be used in oil exploration, specifically the dating of the rock formations in the Gulf of Mexico region. Her theory was ridiculed by geologists with more experience and disputed by professor J.J. Galloway of the University of Texas at Austin. Galloway was quoted saying "Gentlemen, here is this chit of a girl, right out of college, telling us that we can use Foraminifera to determine the age of formation. Gentlemen, you know that it can't be done." Galloway would later capitalize off her discoveries and would use the process to consult for various oil companies.

In 1925, Applin co-authored a paper with Alva C. Ellisor and Hedwig Kniker, which reported her findings that oil-bearing rock formations in the Gulf Coast region could be dated using microfossils. Applin remained with Rio Bravo until 1927, continuing to lead the use of micropaleontology in the oil industry. She was able to have a successful career with the Rio Bravo Oil Company due to the fact that her micropaleontology studies provided index fossils to the company which was vying for the best oil bearing stratigraphic layers. The matching of micro index fossils between stratigraphic layers in not only the Gulf Coast region, but other regions as well, was the main form of oil exploration for oil companies. Applin's discoveries proved to be essential and irreplaceable for drilling operations, up until the use of electric logs became more feasible. Applin contributed a lasting impact on both women previously in, and soon entering, the relatively newer field of geology. Her discoveries transformed geology into a field of study that women could feel much more open in—much more than other, more established fields.

After her stint working for Rio Bravo Oil from 1920 to 1927, Applin worked as a consultant to various other oil companies until 1944. In 1944, Applin and her family moved to Tallahassee, Florida where she worked alongside her husband at the United States Geological Survey, with the task of linking the oil fields of East Texas, across the southeaster United States, and into Florida, using micropaleontology and other methods. Mesozoic formations were highly focused and stressed upon.

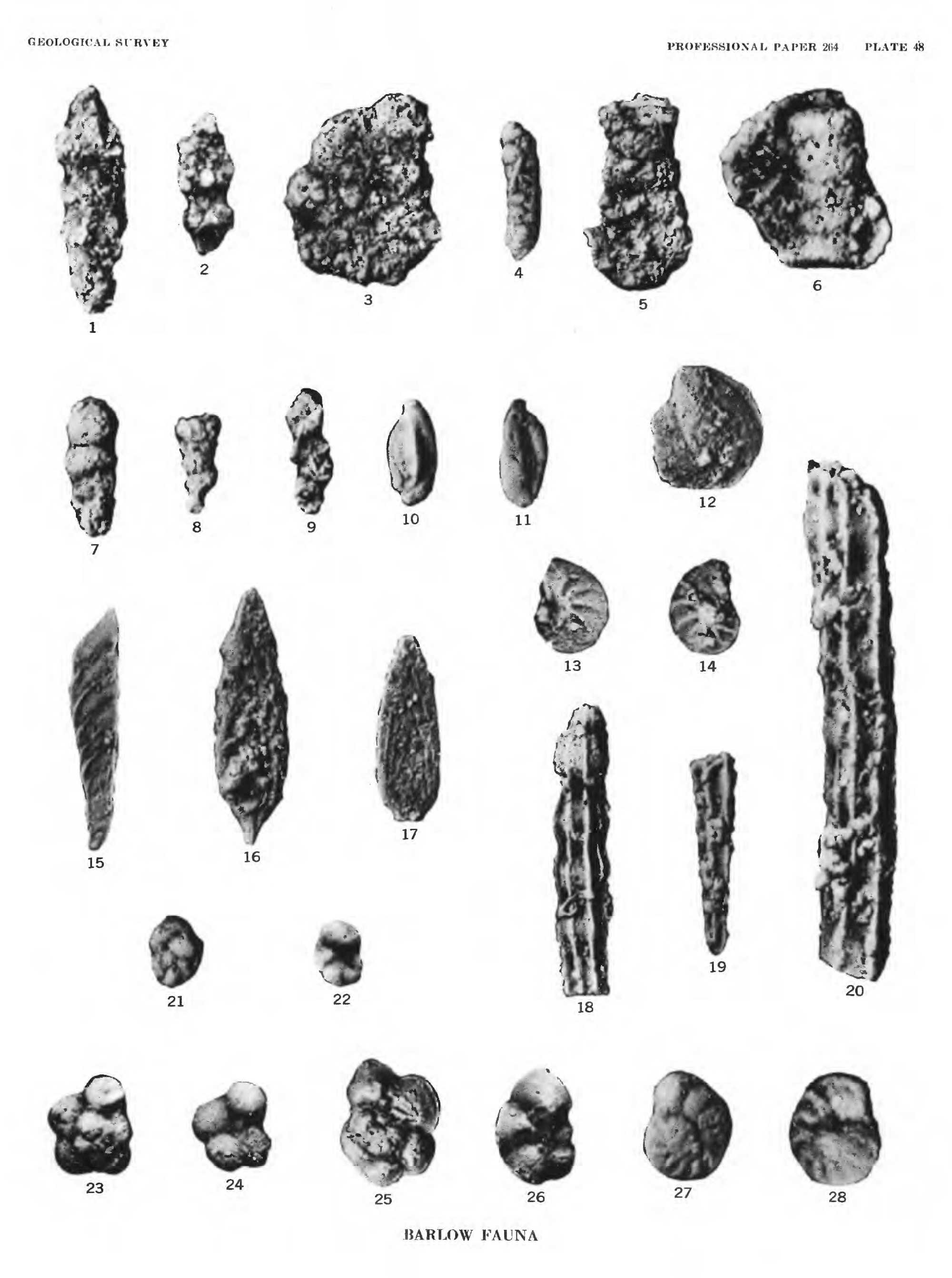
Applin photographed these micro-fossils after her 1955 survey in the Gulf Coast.

During a 1955 survey in the South-East Gulf Coast region of the United States, Applin discovered 4 previously undiscovered species of Foraminifera that helped in piecing together prehistoric environmental conditions in Alabama, Georgia, and Florida In 1960, Applin received a plaque from the Gulf Association of Geological Studies in recognition of her accomplishments and contributions to the field.

Following the "oil boom" decline, Applin and her family moved to Jackson, Mississippi. From there, she wrote papers on stratigraphy, structure of southeastern states, and foraminifera. In 1962, she retired from the Geological Survey. Following retirement, she continued to do research and publish works.

By 1975, Edgar Wesley Owen wrote Trek of the Oil Finders, minimizing the role that Esther and her fellow female paleontologists played in the discovery. Instead, the author praised men who do not acknowledge foraminifera's efficiency and accuracy in biostratigraphy.

== Publications ==
- Applin, Esther (1964). "A Microfauna From the Coker Formation, Alabama" (PDF). Geological Survey Bulletin (1160-D). United States Geological Survey. Bibcode:1964usgs.rept....1A. doi:10.3133/b1160D.
- Applin, Esther. "A Biofacies of Woodbine Age in Southeastern Gulf Coast Region" (PDF). United States Geological Survey.
- Applin, Paul Livingston; Applin, Esther (1965). "The Comanche Series and associated rocks in the subsurface in central and south Florida" (PDF). United States Geological Survey.
- Applin, Paul Livingston; Applin, Esther (1947). "Regional subsurface stratigraphy, structure, and correlation of middle and early Upper Cretaceous rocks in Alabama, Georgia, and north Florida". US Geological Survey Publication: 4. Bibcode:1947usgs.rept....4A. doi:10.3133/oc26.
- Maher, John Charles; Applin, Esther R (1971). "Geologic framework and petroleum potential of the Atlantic Coastal Plain and continental shelf". USGS Report. Professional Paper. United States Geological Survey: 11. Bibcode:1971usgs.rept...11M. doi:10.3133/pp659.
- Applin, Paul Livingston; Applin, Esther (1953). "The cored section in George Vasen's Fee well 1, Stone County, Mississippi". Circular. United States Geological Survey. doi:10.3133/cir298. hdl:2027/uc1.32106020888019.
- Applin, Paul L.; Applin, Esther R. (1953). "The Cored Section in George Vasen's Fee Well 1 Stone County, Mississippi" (PDF). United States Geological Survey.

== See also ==
- Offshore oil and gas in the Gulf of Mexico (United States)
