= List of Guggenheim Fellowships awarded in 1979 =

Two hundred and ninety-one scholars, artists, and scientists received Guggenheim Fellowships in 1979. $4,655,000 was disbursed among the recipients, who were chosen from an applicant pool of 2,974. 123 schools were represented, with University of California, Berkeley and Columbia University tied for most faculty winners (9 each), followed by Cornell University, Massachusetts Institute of Technology, University of Minnesota, and University of Pennsylvania (8 each). The University of California system had 26 fellowships total among its faculty.

Kurt Baier of the University of Pittsburgh was awarded a grant from the Rockefeller Foundation a month prior to the Guggenheim announcement. Awardees are unable to accept both, so Baier declined the Guggenheim.

== 1979 United States and Canada Fellows ==
| Category | Field of Study | Fellow | Institutional association | Research topic | Notes | Ref |
|---|---|---|---|---|---|---|
| Creative Arts | Choreography | Lucinda Childs | Lucinda Childs Dance Company | Choreographed Dance | | |
| Creative Arts | Choreography | Kenneth King | | Choreographing | | |
| Creative Arts | Choreography | Rosalind Newman | Rosalind Newman and Dancers | Choreographing | | |
| Creative Arts | Drama & Performance Art | Robert Ely Bagg | University of Massachusetts Amherst | Verse translation of Sophocles' Oedipus the King | | |
| Creative Arts | Drama & Performance Art | Christopher Durang | | Playwriting | | |
| Creative Arts | Drama & Performance Art | Dick Goldberg | | Playwriting | | |
| Creative Arts | Fiction | John Casey | University of Virginia | Finishing novel called Monticello and the All-Night People's Drugstore; starting another novel | | |
| Creative Arts | Fiction | Don DeLillo | | Writing | | |
| Creative Arts | Fiction | Robert C. S. Downs | University of Arizona | Writing | | |
| Creative Arts | Fiction | Sam Koperwas | | Writing | | |
| Creative Arts | Fiction | Howard Frank Mosher | | Writing | | |
| Creative Arts | Fiction | Thomas Savage | | Wrote Her Side of It (published 1981) | | |
| Creative Arts | Fiction | Susan R. Shreve | George Mason University | Writing | | |
| Creative Arts | Fiction | Roberta Silman | | Writing | | |
| Creative Arts | Fiction | Allen Wier | Hollins College | Wrote Departing As Air (published 1983) | | |
| Creative Arts | Film | Thom Andersen | Ohio State University | Filmmaking | | |
| Creative Arts | Film | Haile Gerima | Howard University | Filmmaking | | |
| Creative Arts | Film | Hilary T. Harris | | Filmmaking | | |
| Creative Arts | Film | Barbara Kopple | Cabin Creek Films | Filmmaking | | |
| Creative Arts | Film | Hart Perry | Columbia University | Holographic filmmaking | | |
| Creative Arts | Film | David Schickele | | Filmmaking | | |
| Creative Arts | Fine Arts | Vito Acconci | | Conceptual art | | |
| Creative Arts | Fine Arts | Eugene Brodsky | | Painting | Also won in 1987 | |
| Creative Arts | Fine Arts | Bruno Civitico | University of New Hampshire | Painting | | |
| Creative Arts | Fine Arts | Donna Dennis | | Sculpture | | |
| Creative Arts | Fine Arts | Laddie John Dill | UCLA | Painting | | |
| Creative Arts | Fine Arts | John Duff | | Sculpture | | |
| Creative Arts | Fine Arts | Louise Fishman | Columbia University | Painting | | |
| Creative Arts | Fine Arts | Charles Garabedian | UC Santa Barbara | Painting and ceramics | | |
| Creative Arts | Fine Arts | Paul Harris | California College of Arts and Crafts | Sculpture | | |
| Creative Arts | Fine Arts | Phoebe Helman | Pratt Institute, Parsons School of Design, and New York Institute of Technology | Sculpture | | |
| Creative Arts | Fine Arts | Steven J. Kaltenbach | California State University, Sacramento | Painting | | |
| Creative Arts | Fine Arts | Allan Kaprow | UC San Diego | Performance art | Also won in 1967 | |
| Creative Arts | Fine Arts | Michael Loew | School of Visual Arts | Painting | | |
| Creative Arts | Fine Arts | Manuel Neri | UC Davis | Sculpture | | |
| Creative Arts | Fine Arts | Maria Nordman | | Sculpture | | |
| Creative Arts | Fine Arts | Harvey Quaytman | Parsons School of Design | Painting | Also won in 1985 | |
| Creative Arts | Fine Arts | Jack Roth | Ramapo College of New Jersey | Painting | | |
| Creative Arts | Fine Arts | Angelo Savelli | University of Texas at Arlington (visting) | Painting | | |
| Creative Arts | Music Composition | Chester Biscardi | Sarah Lawrence College | Two major compositions: "a musical drama based on his own translation of Luigi Pirandello's I giganti della montagna, and a piece for solo flute or piano" | | |
| Creative Arts | Music Composition | John Carisi | Manhattan School of Music | Composing | | |
| Creative Arts | Music Composition | Marc-Antonio Consoli | | Composing | Also won in 1971 | |
| Creative Arts | Music Composition | Jere Trent Hutcheson | Michigan State University | Composing | | |
| Creative Arts | Music Composition | David Koblitz | Pace University and Rutgers University | Composing | | |
| Creative Arts | Music Composition | Robert Hall Lewis | Johns Hopkins University, Peabody Conservatory, and Goucher College | Composing his Third Symphony and some chamber music | Also won in 1966 | |
| Creative Arts | Music Composition | Jay Reise | Hamilton College | Composing | | |
| Creative Arts | Music Composition | Phillip Rhodes | Mankato State University (in residence) | Writing an opera | | |
| Creative Arts | Music Composition | Terry Riley | Mills College | Composing | | |
| Creative Arts | Photography | Linda Connor | San Francisco Art Institute | Travel in Asia | | |
| Creative Arts | Photography | Barbara Crane | Art Institute of Chicago | Career retrospective | | |
| Creative Arts | Photography | Louis Faurer | Parsons School of Design | | | |
| Creative Arts | Photography | Larry Fink | Cooper Union (visiting) | Work in Martins Creek | Also won in 1976 | |
| Creative Arts | Photography | Alex Harris | University of North Carolina and Duke University | Expansion of his 1973 photographic publication Old Ones of New Mexico | | |
| Creative Arts | Photography | Stuart Klipper | | | Also won in 1989 | |
| Creative Arts | Photography | Larry E. McPherson | Memphis State University | Studying the attitudes of the American Indian toward nature and to demonstrate these attitudes in creative landscape photography | | |
| Creative Arts | Photography | Ray K. Metzker | Philadelphia College of Art | | Also won in 1966 | |
| Creative Arts | Photography | Leland Rice | Pomona College | | | |
| Creative Arts | Photography | Rosalind Fox Solomon | | Peruvian Andes | | |
| Creative Arts | Poetry | Frank Bidart | Brandeis University | Third book of poetry | | |
| Creative Arts | Poetry | Hayden Carruth | | Writing current work, The Sleeping Beauty, and revising earlier poetic works | Also won in 1965 | |
| Creative Arts | Poetry | John Engels | Saint Michael's College | Work on Vivaldi in Early Fall, his fourth book of poetry | | |
| Creative Arts | Poetry | Frederick Feirstein | | Writing | | |
| Creative Arts | Poetry | Robert Hass | Saint Mary's College of California | Writing | | |
| Creative Arts | Poetry | John Logan | University of Buffalo | Writing | | |
| Creative Arts | Poetry | John Montague | University College Cork | Wrote Selected Poems (published 1982) | | |
| Creative Arts | Poetry | Gary Soto | UC Berkeley | Writing | | |
| Creative Arts | Video & Audio | Stefan R. Moore | | | | |
| Creative Arts | Video & Audio | Stan VanDerBeek | University of Maryland, Baltimore County | Computer animation and filmmaking | | |
| Creative Arts | Video & Audio | B. Woody Vasulka | University of Buffalo | Video work | | |
| Humanities | American Literature | Thomas C. Moser | Stanford University | | | |
| Humanities | American Literature | Roy H. Winnick | | Biography of Archibald McLeish | | |
| Humanities | Architecture, Planning, and Design | Spiro Kostof | UC Berkeley | Medievalizing of Rome, 200-1200 AD | | |
| Humanities | Architecture, Planning, and Design | Esther McCoy | | Modern architecture in Southern California, 1900-1978 | | |
| Humanities | Architecture, Planning, and Design | Franklin K. Toker | Carnegie Mellon University | Archaeological history of the Cathedral of Florence | | |
| Humanities | Biography | Michael Mott | College of William & Mary (in residence) | Thomas Merton | | |
| Humanities | British History | James S. Cockburn | University of Maryland at College Park | Crime and the administration of criminal law in England, 1558-1625 | | |
| Humanities | British History | Allan Cunningham | Simon Fraser University | | | |
| Humanities | British History | J. H. Hexter | Washington University in St. Louis (in residence) | English constitutional crisis of liberty in the first half of the 17th century | Also won in 1942 and 1947 | |
| Humanities | British History | Abraham D. Kriegel | Memphis State University | Values of early 19th-century English aristocracy | | |
| Humanities | British History | Fred J. Levy | University of Washington | England in the 1590s | | |
| Humanities | British History | Donald J. Olsen | Vassar College | Comparative study of London, Paris, and Vienna since the late 18th century | Also won in 1967 | |
| Humanities | Classics | Elizabeth J. W. Barber | Occidental College | Looking for traces of the development of an ancient textile industry that may have influenced classical Greek art and aided such figures as Homer in the transmission of folklore and myth | | |
| Humanities | Classics | Frederick A. Cooper | University of Minnesota | Doric Temple of Apollo at Bassae | | |
| Humanities | Classics | Pietro Pucci | Cornell University | Repetition and difference in Homer | | |
| Humanities | East Asian Studies | Marius B. Jansen | Princeton University | Japan's modern transformation | | |
| Humanities | East Asian Studies | David Kopf | University of Minnesota | History of Hinduism as a popular faith, not focusing on the ritual and caste system that is usually depicted | | |
| Humanities | East Asian Studies | Jonathan D. Spence | Yale University | Cultural interplay between the Europe of the Counter-Reformation and late Ming dynasty China | | |
| Humanities | Economic History | Irving Martin Abella | York University | Canadian government and Jewish refugees, 1933-1948 | | |
| Humanities | Economic History | Philip D. Curtin | Johns Hopkins University | World history of cross-cultural trade up to the 19th century | Also won in 1965 | |
| Humanities | Economic History | Harold Troper | University of Toronto | | | |
| Humanities | English Literature | Nina Auerbach | University of Pennsylvania | Victorian womanhood and literary character | | |
| Humanities | English Literature | Felicia Bonaparte | Massachusetts Institute of Technology (visiting) | Mythological worlds of George Eliot, Thomas Hardy, and D. H. Lawrence | | |
| Humanities | English Literature | Thomas Byrom | Oxford University | | | |
| Humanities | English Literature | Robert Daly | University of Buffalo | English Puritan poetry | | |
| Humanities | English Literature | Elizabeth Story Donno | Columbia University | Eloquence in 16th-century England | Also won in 1963 | |
| Humanities | English Literature | Robert N. Essick | California State University | Catalogue raisonne of William Blake's separate plates | | |
| Humanities | English Literature | Robert Folkenflik | UC Irvine | The artist as hero, 1660-1820 | | |
| Humanities | English Literature | William Frost | UC Santa Barbara | Virgil translations of John Dryden | Also won in 1958 | |
| Humanities | English Literature | Donald Johnson Greene | University of Southern California | | Also won in 1957 | |
| Humanities | English Literature | Michael Groden | University of Western Ontario | Critical edition of the works of James Joyce, and a study on narrative obscurity in several novels | | |
| Humanities | English Literature | James Hepburn | Bates College | Fourth volume of an edition of the letters of Arnold Bennett | | |
| Humanities | English Literature | Norman N. Holland | University of Buffalo | Shakespeare's psychological strategies | | |
| Humanities | English Literature | Leslie A. Marchand | Rutgers University | One-volume selection of Byron's letters and journals | Also won in 1967 | |
| Humanities | English Literature | Elizabeth N. McCutcheon | University of Hawaii at Manoa | Rhetorical reading of Thomas More's Utopia | | |
| Humanities | English Literature | Norman Page | University of Alberta | Critical biography of A. E. Housman | | |
| Humanities | Fine Arts Research | Phyllis Pray Bober | Bryn Mawr College | Ulisse Aldrovandi and collections of antiquities in 16th-century Rome | | |
| Humanities | Fine Arts Research | Peter C. Bunnell | Princeton University | Photographs by Alfred Stieglitz | | |
| Humanities | Fine Arts Research | Jack D. Flam | Brooklyn College | Critical biography of Henri Matisse | | |
| Humanities | Fine Arts Research | Elizabeth Gilmore Holt | | Influence of national exhibitions and international expositions in European art, 1874-1900 | | |
| Humanities | Fine Arts Research | Elisabeth B. MacDougall | Dumbarton Oaks and Harvard University | Throne rooms and audience halls of the Italian Renaissance and their decorations | | |
| Humanities | Folklore & Popular Culture | David E. Bynum | Harvard University | | | |
| Humanities | Folklore & Popular Culture | Tom Lowenstein | | | | |
| Humanities | French History | Philip C. Bankwitz | Trinity College, Hartford | Daladier, Flandin, and the crisis of political leadership in modern France, 1930-1947 | | |
| Humanities | French History | John M. Merriman | Yale University | French cities and social, economic, and political change, 1815-1848 | | |
| Humanities | French Literature | Serge Gavronsky | Barnard College | Reality and literary languages in the works of three contemporary French poets | | |
| Humanities | General Nonfiction | David Horowitz | | | | |
| Humanities | General Nonfiction | Stanley Kauffmann | Yale University (visiting) and Graduate Center CUNY (visiting) | Autobiographical essays | | |
| Humanities | German & Scandinavian Literature | Benjamin Bennett | University of Virginia | Religious and poetic thought in 18th-century Germany | | |
| Humanities | German & Scandinavian Literature | Irving N. Wohlfarth | University of Oregon | Biography of Walter Benjamin | | |
| Humanities | History of Science & Technology | John G. Burke | UCLA | General history of the science of meteoritics | | |
| Humanities | History of Science & Technology | Arthur I. Miller | University of Massachusetts, Lowell | | | |
| Humanities | History of Science & Technology | Steven Shapin | UC San Diego | Social uses of conceptions of nature | | |
| Humanities | Iberian & Latin American History | Stuart B. Schwartz | University of Minnesota | History of the sugar industry in Brazil, looking at the social relations growing from the plantation economy | | |
| Humanities | Iberian & Latin American History | William B. Taylor | University of Colorado | Peasants and brokers in rural Mexico | | |
| Humanities | Linguistics | Irene R. Fairley | Northeastern University | | | |
| Humanities | Linguistics | Charles A. Ferguson | Stanford University | | | |
| Humanities | Linguistics | Larry M. Hyman | University of Southern California | Comparative Grassfields Bantu grammar | | |
| Humanities | Literary Criticism | Paul N. Banks | Newberry Library | | | |
| Humanities | Literary Criticism | Jonathan Culler | Cornell University | Semiotic and poststructuralist literary criticism | | |
| Humanities | Literary Criticism | John Hollander | Yale University | Treatment of natural sound in Romantic poetry | | |
| Humanities | Literary Criticism | John O. McCormick | Rutgers University | Critical biography of George Santayana | Also won in 1964 | |
| Humanities | Literary Criticism | Ruth B. Yeazell | UCLA | Marriage proposal scenes in English fiction | | |
| Humanities | Medieval History | William J. Courtenay | University of Wisconsin-Madison | Education and scholasticism in 14th-century England | | |
| Humanities | Medieval History | Walter Goffart | University of Toronto | | | |
| Humanities | Medieval Literature | Joseph J. Duggan | UC Berkeley | Romance epic of the Middle Ages | | |
| Humanities | Medieval Literature | John B. Friedman | University of Illinois Urbana-Champaign | | | |
| Humanities | Medieval Literature | Arthur B. Groos | Cornell University | Religion and science in Wolfram von Eschenbach's Parzival | | |
| Humanities | Medieval Literature | Kathleen L. Scott | | | | |
| Humanities | Music Research | Jeffrey G. Kurtzman | Rice University | Printed Italian vesper music, 1540-1700 | | |
| Humanities | Music Research | Richard D. Leppert | University of Minnesota | Musical iconography in English paintings of the 17th and 18th centuries | | |
| Humanities | Music Research | Robert Offergeld | | Life and works of Louis Moreau Gottschalk | | |
| Humanities | Near Eastern Studies | Anwar G. Chejne | University of Minnesota | Manuscripts written in 16th-century Spain by members of the suppressed Moorish community | | |
| Humanities | Near Eastern Studies | Bentley Layton | Yale University | Catalogue of Coptic manuscripts acquired by the British Museum since 1905 | | |
| Humanities | Near Eastern Studies | Stephen J. Lieberman | University of Pennsylvania Museum | Linguistic and sociolinguistic studies in the Sumerian loanwords in Akkadian | | |
| Humanities | Philosophy | Robert D. Cumming | Columbia University | Self recent continental philosophy | | |
| Humanities | Philosophy | Hartry H. Field | University of Southern California | | | |
| Humanities | Philosophy | Jaakko Hintikka | Stanford University | | | |
| Humanities | Philosophy | Charles H. Kahn | University of Pennsylvania | Origins of the concept of will and freedom of choice | | |
| Humanities | Philosophy | Edward P. Mahoney | Duke University | Concept of metaphysical hierarchy in Western philosophy | | |
| Humanities | Religion | Wayne A. Meeks | Yale University | Social context and formation of Pauline Christianity | | |
| Humanities | Religion | Jacob Neusner | Brown University | History and structure of the world-view of nascent Rabbinic Judaism | Also won in 1973 | |
| Humanities | Religion | John Van Seters | University of North Carolina at Chapel Hill | Early Hebrew historiography | | |
| Humanities | Renaissance History | Marjorie O'Rourke Boyle | | Humanist nature of Erasmus' controversy with Luther | | |
| Humanities | Renaissance History | De Lamar Jensen | Brigham Young University | | | |
| Humanities | Renaissance History | Georg Nicolaus Knauer | University of Pennsylvania | Latin translations and commentaries of Homer up to 1600 | | |
| Humanities | Science Writing | Raymond Bowers | Cornell University | Technology and public policy | | |
| Humanities | Slavic Literature | Ladislav Matejka | University of Michigan | Modern trends in East European poetics | | |
| Humanities | Slavic Literature | William Mills Todd III | Stanford University | | | |
| Humanities | Spanish & Portuguese Literature | Andrew P. Debicki | University of Kansas | | Also won in 1970 | |
| Humanities | Spanish & Portuguese Literature | José Olivio Jiménez | Hunter College, City University of New York | Poetry of Vicente Aleixandre | | |
| Humanities | Spanish & Portuguese Literature | Harold G. Jones | University of Houston | Catalogue of the non-Barberini Hispanic printed books of the 15th through 17th centuries in the Vatican Library | | |
| Humanities | Theatre Arts | Harold Clurman | Hunter College, City University of New York | Eugene O'Neill | Also won in 1975 | |
| Humanities | Theatre Arts | Mel Gussow | The New York Times and New York University | Analytical history of the New York Shakespeare Festival | | |
| Humanities | Theatre Arts | Laurence Senelick | Tufts University | | Also won in 1987 | |
| Humanities | Theatre Arts | William Weaver | Columbia University | Biography of Eleonora Duse | | |
| Humanities | United States History | Lance Banning | University of Kentucky | James Madison | | |
| Humanities | United States History | James O. Breeden | Southern Methodist University | | | |
| Humanities | United States History | John M. Cooper | University of Wisconsin-Madison | Comparative study of Theodore Roosevelt and Woodrow Wilson | | |
| Humanities | United States History | Douglas Greenberg | Princeton University (visiting) | Public festivities in early America | | |
| Humanities | United States History | Robert A. Gross | Amherst College | Social history of the Transcendentalists and their world | | |
| Humanities | United States History | David M. Katzman | University of Kansas | | | |
| Humanities | United States History | Peter Kolchin | University of New Mexico | Comparative aspects of American Slavery and Russian feudalism | | |
| Humanities | United States History | William R. Louis | University of Texas at Austin | Research at All Souls College, Oxford | | |
| Humanities | United States History | Phillip Shaw Paludan | University of Kansas | | | |
| Humanities | United States History | Michael Perman | University of Illinois Chicago | Wrote The Road to Redemption: Southern Politics, 1869-1879 (published 1984) | | |
| Humanities | United States History | Laurence Veysey | UC Santa Cruz | | | |
| Natural Sciences | Applied Mathematics | Lloyd Demetrius | Rockefeller University (visiting) | Application of thermodynamic theory to ecological systems | | |
| Natural Sciences | Applied Mathematics | Simon A. Levin | Cornell University | Mathematical theories of population dynamics and community structure | | |
| Natural Sciences | Applied Mathematics | Willem V. R. Malkus | Massachusetts Institute of Technology | | Also won in 1971 | |
| Natural Sciences | Applied Mathematics | H. Eugene Stanley | Boston University | | | |
| Natural Sciences | Applied Mathematics | Victor Twersky | University of Illinois Chicago | Biophysical applications of scattering theory | Also won in 1972 | |
| Natural Sciences | Astronomy & Astrophysics | Jonathan Arons | UC Berkeley | High-energy astrophysics | | |
| Natural Sciences | Astronomy & Astrophysics | Kenneth S. Brecher | Massachusetts Institute of Technology | | | |
| Natural Sciences | Astronomy & Astrophysics | F. Curtis Michel | Rice University | Theoretical studies in astrophysics | | |
| Natural Sciences | Astronomy & Astrophysics | James W. Truran Jr. | University of Illinois Urbana-Champaign | Research at the University of Cambridge | | |
| Natural Sciences | Chemistry | Richard F. W. Bader | McMaster University | Electronic structure of molecules | | |
| Natural Sciences | Chemistry | Theodore L. Brown | University of Illinois Urbana-Champaign | | | |
| Natural Sciences | Chemistry | Thomas C. Bruice | UC Santa Barbara | Cytochrome P450 | | |
| Natural Sciences | Chemistry | Robert M. Coates | University of Illinois Urbana-Champaign | | | |
| Natural Sciences | Chemistry | Robert I. Cukier | Michigan State University | Statistical mechanics | | |
| Natural Sciences | Chemistry | Pierre Deslongchamps | University of Sherbrooke | Synthetic organic chemistry | | |
| Natural Sciences | Chemistry | Craig Jon Eckhardt | University of Nebraska–Lincoln | How the application of stress change the optical properties of certain molecular crystals | | |
| Natural Sciences | Chemistry | Thomas Koenig | University of Oregon | Research with Lionel Salem in Paris | | |
| Natural Sciences | Chemistry | Robert J. Le Roy | University of Waterloo | Chemical physics | | |
| Natural Sciences | Chemistry | John Polanyi | University of Toronto | | Also won in 1970 | |
| Natural Sciences | Chemistry | Jack Simons | University of Utah | Fundamentals of solar power | | |
| Natural Sciences | Chemistry | Edward C. Taylor | Princeton University | Organic synthesis and heterocyclic chemistry | | |
| Natural Sciences | Computer Science | Jean-Loup Baer | University of Washington | | | |
| Natural Sciences | Computer Science | Herbert B. Keller | California Institute of Technology | Research with Jacques-Louis Lions at INRIA | | |
| Natural Sciences | Computer Science | Jack Keil Wolf | University of Massachusetts Amherst | Analysis and synthesis of computer-communication networks | | |
| Natural Sciences | Earth Science | Robert S. Coe | UC Santa Cruz | | | |
| Natural Sciences | Earth Science | Peter Molnar | Massachusetts Institute of Technology | | | |
| Natural Sciences | Earth Science | Peter B. Rhines | Woods Hole Oceanographic Institution | | | |
| Natural Sciences | Earth Science | Frederick S. Szalay | Hunter College, City University of New York | Mammalian evolutionary biology | | |
| Natural Sciences | Mathematics | P. D. Elliott | University of Colorado | Number theory | | |
| Natural Sciences | Mathematics | Jack K. Hale | Brown University | Bifurcation theory and partial differential equations | | |
| Natural Sciences | Mathematics | Steven L. Kleiman | Massachusetts Institute of Technology | | | |
| Natural Sciences | Mathematics | Robert T. Powers | University of Pennsylvania | Functional analysis and mathematical physics | | |
| Natural Sciences | Mathematics | Joel A. Smoller | University of Michigan | Systems of reaction diffusion equation | | |
| Natural Sciences | Medicine & Health | Michael A. Becker | UC San Diego | Cellular biochemistry | | |
| Natural Sciences | Medicine & Health | Stuart Handwerger | Duke University | Physiology of human placental hormones | | |
| Natural Sciences | Medicine & Health | Michael P. Hlastala | University of Washington | | | |
| Natural Sciences | Molecular & Cellular Biology | Nina Agabian | University of Washington | | | |
| Natural Sciences | Molecular & Cellular Biology | Richard Calendar | UC Berkeley | Molecular biology of the gene | | |
| Natural Sciences | Molecular & Cellular Biology | Glyn Dawson | University of Chicago | | | |
| Natural Sciences | Molecular & Cellular Biology | Howard Gest | Indiana University | Evolution of oxygen on Earth | Also won in 1970 | |
| Natural Sciences | Molecular & Cellular Biology | Richard I. Gumport | University of Illinois Urbana-Champaign | | | |
| Natural Sciences | Molecular & Cellular Biology | David I. Hirsh | University of Colorado | Cell differentiation | | |
| Natural Sciences | Molecular & Cellular Biology | Aaron Lewis | Cornell University | Molecular mechanism of proton transport through a cell membrane | | |
| Natural Sciences | Molecular & Cellular Biology | Peter B. Moore | Yale University | Structure and properties of biological macromolecules by nuclear magnetic resonance | | |
| Natural Sciences | Molecular & Cellular Biology | John F. Nagle | Carnegie-Mellon University | Charge transport in biomembranes | | |
| Natural Sciences | Molecular & Cellular Biology | Donald W. Tinkle | University of Michigan | Ecological and evolutionary components of life history strategies among reptiles | | |
| Natural Sciences | Molecular & Cellular Biology | Allan Charles Wilson | UC Berkeley | Molecular and organismal evolution | Also won in 1972 | |
| Natural Sciences | Neuroscience | David M. Maurice | Stanford University | Research at the University of Paris | | |
| Natural Sciences | Organismic Biology & Ecology | Eric L. Charnov | University of Utah | Evolution of sexual reproduction in plants and lower animals | | |
| Natural Sciences | Organismic Biology & Ecology | Berthold K. Hölldobler | Harvard University | | | |
| Natural Sciences | Organismic Biology & Ecology | Horace Judson | | | | |
| Natural Sciences | Organismic Biology & Ecology | Warren Porter | University of Wisconsin-Madison | Prediction of climatic effects on population dynamics of small mammals | | |
| Natural Sciences | Organismic Biology & Ecology | Lynn M. Riddiford | University of Washington | | | |
| Natural Sciences | Physics | Marshall Baker | University of Washington | | | |
| Natural Sciences | Physics | Lowell S. Brown | University of Washington | | | |
| Natural Sciences | Physics | Kazumi Maki | University of Southern California | Research at Paris-Sud University | | |
| Natural Sciences | Physics | Thomas A. O'Halloran Jr. | University of Illinois Urbana-Champaign | | | |
| Natural Sciences | Physics | Jogesh C. Pati | University of Maryland | Research at the Institute of Physics, Bhubaneswar | | |
| Natural Sciences | Physics | John D. Reppy | Cornell University | Low-temperature physics | Also won in 1972 | |
| Natural Sciences | Physics | Malvin A. Ruderman | Columbia University | | Also won in 1956 | |
| Natural Sciences | Physics | Kenneth G. Wilson | Cornell University | Elementary particle physics | | |
| Natural Sciences | Physics | William M. Yen | University of Wisconsin-Madison | Solid-state physics | | |
| Natural Sciences | Plant Science | Stanley P. Burg | | | | |
| Natural Sciences | Plant Science | F. Stuart Chapin III | University of Alaska | Nutritional ecology of wild plants | | |
| Natural Sciences | Plant Science | Bryce Kendrick | University of Waterloo | Coral in the South Pacific | | |
| Natural Sciences | Plant Science | Richard C. Lewontin | Harvard University | | | |
| Natural Sciences | Statistics | Ulf Grenander | Brown University | Mathematical theory of regular structures | | |
| Natural Sciences | Statistics | William Kruskal | University of Chicago | | | |
| Natural Sciences | Statistics | Erich L. Lehmann | UC Berkeley | Theory of estimation | Also won in 1955 and 1966 | |
| Social Sciences | Anthropology and Cultural Studies | Ward H. Goodenough | University of Pennsylvania | Cultural anthropology | | |
| Social Sciences | Anthropology and Cultural Studies | Richard Pearson | University of British Columbia | | | |
| Social Sciences | Anthropology and Cultural Studies | Laurence C. Thompson | University of Hawaii at Manoa | Compilation of dictionaries for two Pacific Northwest Indian languages: Klallam and Thompson River | | |
| Social Sciences | Anthropology and Cultural Studies | Annette B. Weiner | University of Texas Austin | Inalienable wealth, viewed through an analysis of Māori valued objects | | |
| Social Sciences | Anthropology and Cultural Studies | Gary Witherspoon | University of Michigan | Native American social, political, and economic thought | | |
| Social Sciences | Economics | Jere R. Behrman | University of Pennsylvania | Analysis of the role of women in economic development | | |
| Social Sciences | Economics | Charles Bowden | University of Arizona | Growth and marketing of muskmelons and cantaloupes | | |
| Social Sciences | Economics | Rudiger Dornbusch | Massachusetts Institute of Technology | | | |
| Social Sciences | Economics | B. Curtis Eaves | Stanford University | Operations research and mathematical programming | | |
| Social Sciences | Economics | Herschel I. Grossman | Brown University | Employment fluctuations and the mitigation of risk | | |
| Social Sciences | Economics | John H. Kareken | University of Minnesota | Monetary policy | | |
| Social Sciences | Economics | John E. Roemer | UC Davis | | | |
| Social Sciences | Economics | Hal R. Varian | University of Michigan | Economics of information | | |
| Social Sciences | Education | Tyll van Geel | University of Rochester | Moral and philosophical issues in educational policy and public law | | |
| Social Sciences | Geography & Environmental Studies | James R. Shortridge | University of Kansas | Middle West as a regional label | | |
| Social Sciences | Law | Louis Henkin | Columbia University | Comparative analysis of national human rights systems | | |
| Social Sciences | Law | John T. Noonan Jr. | UC Berkeley | Bribery in the moral and legal tradition of the West | Also won in 1965 | |
| Social Sciences | Law | Jeffrey O'Connell | | | Also won in 1972 | |
| Social Sciences | Law | John Phillip Reid | New York University | Constitutional history of the American Revolution | | |
| Social Sciences | Political Science | Suzanne Berger | Massachusetts Institute of Technology | Changes in the politics of French Catholics, 1958-1978 | | |
| Social Sciences | Political Science | Leon D. Epstein | University of Wisconsin-Madison | Organizational, programmatic, and electoral limitations of American political parties | | |
| Social Sciences | Political Science | Heinz Eulau | Stanford University | | | |
| Social Sciences | Political Science | Robert C. Fried | UCLA | Comparative crime control | | |
| Social Sciences | Political Science | John E. Jackson | University of Pennsylvania | Dynamic models of political-economic interaction | | |
| Social Sciences | Political Science | John W. Kingdon | University of Michigan | Processes prior to final public policy choices | | |
| Social Sciences | Political Science | Samuel Krislov | Brandeis University | Role of courts | | |
| Social Sciences | Psychology | Kenneth Keniston | Massachusetts Institute of Technology | | | |
| Social Sciences | Psychology | Vladimir J. Konečni | UC San Diego | Emotional factors in interpersonal aggressive behavior | | |
| Social Sciences | Psychology | Michael I. Posner | University of Oregon | Chronometric analysis of nervous systems | | |
| Social Sciences | Psychology | Naomi Weisstein | University of Buffalo | Psychophysical studies in visual perception | | |
| Social Sciences | Psychology | Steven R. Yussen | University of Wisconsin-Madison | Growth of insight during childhood | | |
| Social Sciences | Sociology | Jeffrey C. Alexander | UCLA | Watergate and the crisis of civil society | | |
| Social Sciences | Sociology | Bernard Barber | Barnard College and Columbia University | Problem of trust in American society | | |
| Social Sciences | Sociology | Rose Laub Coser | State University of New York at Stony Brook | Analysis of social factors bearing on attitudes and behavior | | |
| Social Sciences | Sociology | Donald N. Levine | University of Chicago | Forms and functions of sociological knowledge | | |
| Social Sciences | Sociology | Gilbert F. Rozman | Princeton University | 19th-century urban transformation in Japan | | |
| Social Sciences | Sociology | Roberta G. Simmons | University of Minnesota | Policy and ethical issues involved in organ transplants | | |
| Social Sciences | Sociology | Jerome H. Skolnick | UC Berkeley | Sociology of reputation and the law of defamation | | |
| Social Sciences | Sociology | David Sudnow | | Phenomenology of musical performance | | |

== 1979 Latin American and Caribbean Fellows ==
| Category | Field of Study | Fellow | Institutional association | Research topic | Notes | Ref |
|---|---|---|---|---|---|---|
| Creative Arts | Fiction | Héctor Bianciotti | | Writing | | |
| Creative Arts | Fiction | Raúl Navarrete | | Writing | | |
| Creative Arts | Fiction | Augusto Roa Bastos | University of Toulouse-Jean Jaurès | Writing | Also won in 1970 | |
| Creative Arts | Fiction | Luis Rafael Sánchez | University of Puerto Rico | La importancia de llamarse Daniel Santos (published 1988) | | |
| Creative Arts | Fine Arts | Jorge Dubon | | Sculpture | Also won in 1964 and 1969 | |
| Creative Arts | Fine Arts | Leandro Katz | School of Visual Arts | | | |
| Creative Arts | Fine Arts | Donald Locke | | Work at Arizona State University | | |
| Creative Arts | Poetry | Homero Aridjis | | Writing | Also won in 1966 | |
| Creative Arts | Poetry | Gonzalo Rojas | | Returned to Chile from exile | | |
| Humanities | General Nonfiction | Jorge Edwards | | Pablo Neruda | | |
| Humanities | Iberian & Latin American History | José Pedro Barrán | | | | |
| Humanities | Iberian & Latin American History | Benjamín Nahum | | | | |
| Humanities | Science Writing | Horacio E. Cingolani | National University of La Plata | | | |
| Natural Sciences | Earth Science | Luis Aguirre | University of Liverpool | | | |
| Natural Sciences | Mathematics | César Camacho | Instituto Nacional de Matemática Pura e Aplicada | | | |
| Natural Sciences | Medicine & Health | Adolfo Martínez-Palomo | CINVESTAV | | | |
| Natural Sciences | Molecular and Cellular Biology | Alberto Juan Solari | University of Buenos Aires | | | |
| Natural Sciences | Neuroscience | Alejandro F. De Nicola | University of Buenos Aires and Instituto de Biología y Medicina Experimental | | | |
| Natural Sciences | Organismic Biology & Ecology | Gilberto Carlos Gallopín | Fundación Bariloche | | | |
| Natural Sciences | Plant Sciences | Maria Léa Salgado Labouriau | Venezuelan Institute for Scientific Research | Research at the Smithsonian Institution | | |
| Social Sciences | Anthropology and Cultural Studies | Luis Millones | University of Texas Austin (visiting) | | | |
| Social Sciences | Economics | Rolf R. Mantel | Pontifical Catholic University of Argentina and Torcuato di Tella Institute | | | |
| Social Sciences | Political Science | Natalio R. Botana | Torcuato di Tella Institute | | | |
| Social Sciences | Political Science | Guillermo O'Donnell | Center for the Study of State and Society, Buenos Aires | | | |

== See also ==
- Guggenheim Fellowship
- List of Guggenheim Fellowships awarded in 1978
- List of Guggenheim Fellowships awarded in 1980
