= Literary criticism =

Study, evaluation, and interpretation of literature

A genre of arts criticism, literary criticism or literary studies is the study, evaluation, and interpretation of literature. Modern literary criticism is often influenced by literary theory, which is the philosophical analysis of literature's goals and methods. Although the two activities are closely related, literary critics are not always, and have not always been, theorists.

Whether or not literary criticism should be considered a separate field of inquiry from literary theory is a matter of some controversy. For example, The Johns Hopkins Guide to Literary Theory and Criticism draws no distinction between literary theory and literary criticism, and almost always uses the terms together to describe the same concept. Some critics consider literary criticism a practical application of literary theory, because criticism always deals directly with particular literary works, while theory may be more general or abstract.

Literary criticism is often published in essay or book form. Academic literary critics teach in literature departments and publish in academic journals, and more popular critics publish their reviews in broadly circulating periodicals such as The Times Literary Supplement, The New York Times Book Review, The New York Review of Books, the London Review of Books, the Dublin Review of Books, The Nation, Bookforum, and The New Yorker.

== History ==
=== Classical and medieval criticism ===
Literary criticism is thought to have existed as far back as the classical period. In the 4th century BC Aristotle wrote the Poetics, a typology and explanation along with understanding of literary forms with many specific criticisms of contemporary works of art. Poetics developed for the first time the concepts of mimesis and catharsis, which are still crucial in literary studies.

Later classical and medieval criticism often focused on religious texts, and the several long religious traditions of hermeneutics and textual exegesis have had a profound influence on the study of secular texts. This was particularly the case for the literary traditions of the three Abrahamic religions: Jewish literature, Christian literature and Islamic literature.

Literary criticism was also employed in other forms of medieval Arabic literature and Arabic poetry from the 9th century, notably by Al-Jahiz in his al-Bayan wa-'l-tabyin and al-Hayawan, and by Abdullah ibn al-Mu'tazz in his Kitab al-Badi.

=== Renaissance criticism ===
The literary criticism of the Renaissance developed classical ideas of unity of form and content into literary neoclassicism, proclaiming literature as central to culture, entrusting the poet and the author with preservation of a long literary tradition. The birth of Renaissance criticism was in 1498, with the recovery of classic texts, most notably, Giorgio Valla's Latin translation of Aristotle's Poetics. The work of Aristotle, especially Poetics, was the most important influence upon literary criticism until the late eighteenth century. Lodovico Castelvetro was one of the most influential Renaissance critics who wrote commentaries on Aristotle's Poetics in 1570.

=== Baroque criticism ===
The seventeenth-century witnessed the first full-fledged crisis in modernity of the core critical-aesthetic principles inherited from classical antiquity, such as proportion, harmony, unity, decorum, that had long governed, guaranteed, and stabilized Western thinking about artworks. Although Classicism was very far from spent as a cultural force, it was to be gradually challenged by a rival movement, namely Baroque, that favoured the transgressive and the extreme, without laying claim to the unity, harmony, or decorum that supposedly distinguished both nature and its greatest imitator, namely ancient art.

The key concepts of the Baroque aesthetic, such as "conceit' (concetto), "wit" (acutezza, ingegno), and "wonder" (meraviglia), were not fully developed in literary theory until the publication of Emanuele Tesauro's Il Cannocchiale aristotelico (The Aristotelian Telescope) in 1654. This seminal treatise – inspired by Giambattista Marino's epic Adone and the work of the Spanish Jesuit philosopher Baltasar Gracián – developed a theory of metaphor as a universal language of images and as a supreme intellectual act, at once an artifice and an epistemologically privileged mode of access to truth.

=== Enlightenment criticism ===
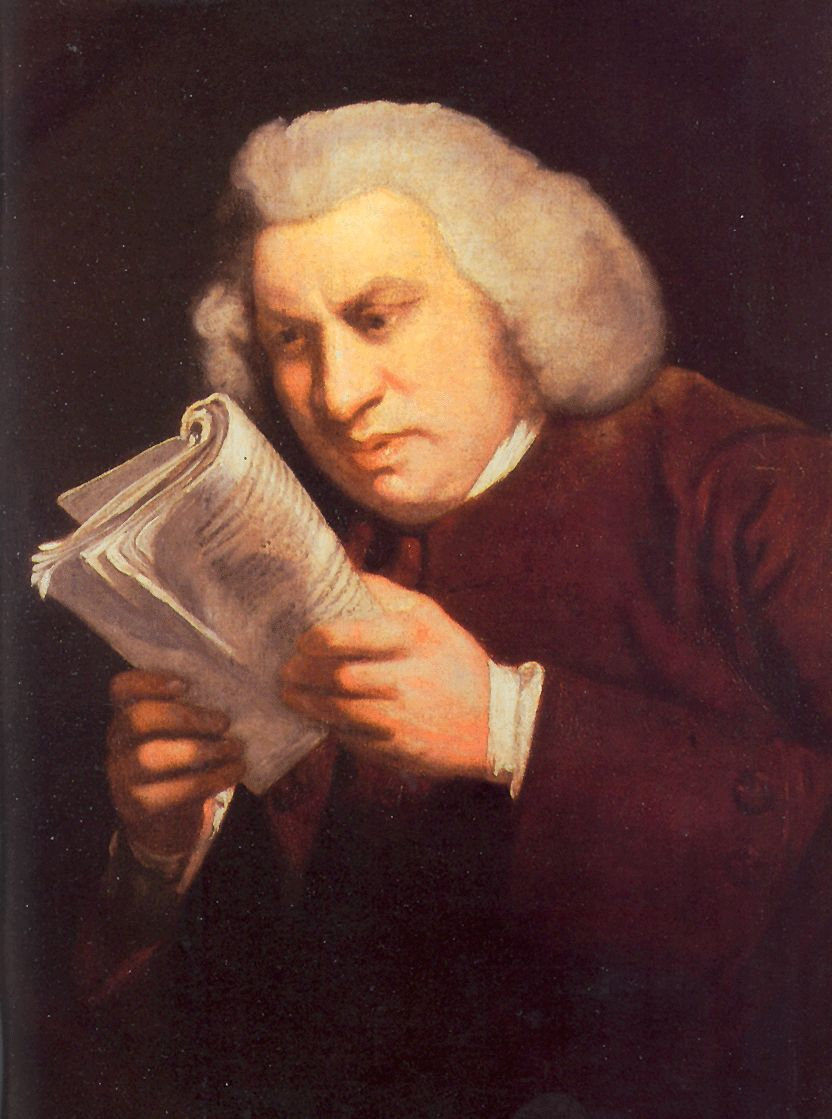
Samuel Johnson, one of the most influential writers and critics of the 18th century. See: Samuel Johnson's literary criticism.

In the Enlightenment period (1700s–1800s), literary criticism became more popular. During this time literacy rates started to rise in the public; no longer was reading exclusive for the wealthy or scholarly. With the rise of the literate public, the swiftness of printing and commercialization of literature, criticism arose too. Reading was no longer viewed solely as educational or as a sacred source of religion; it was a form of entertainment. Literary criticism was influenced by the values and stylistic writing, including clear, bold, precise writing and the more controversial criteria of the author's religious beliefs.

These critical reviews were published in many magazines, newspapers, and journals. The commercialization of literature and its mass production had its downside. The emergent literary market, which was expected to educate the public and keep them away from superstition and prejudice, increasingly diverged from the idealistic control of the Enlightenment theoreticians so that the business of Enlightenment became a business with the Enlightenment. This development – particularly of emergence of entertainment literature – was addressed through an intensification of criticism. Many works of Jonathan Swift, for instance, were criticized including his book Gulliver's Travels, which one critic described as "the detestable story of the Yahoos".

=== 19th-century Romantic criticism ===
The British Romantic movement of the early nineteenth century introduced new aesthetic ideas to literary studies, including the idea that the object of literature need not always be beautiful, noble, or perfect, but that literature itself could enlighten and add to the knowledge of a common subject to the level of the sublime. German Romanticism, which followed closely after the late development of German classicism, emphasized an understanding and beauty of fragmentation that can appear startlingly modern to the reader of English literature, and valued Witz – that is, "wit" or "humor" of a certain sort – more highly than the serious Anglophone Romanticism. The late nineteenth century brought renown to authors known more for their literary criticism than for their own literary work, such as Matthew Arnold.

=== The New Criticism ===
However important all of these aesthetic movements were as antecedents, current ideas about literary criticism derive almost entirely from the new direction taken in the early twentieth century. Early in the century the school of criticism known as Russian Formalism, and slightly later the New Criticism in Britain and in the United States, came to dominate the study and discussion of literature in the English-speaking world. Both schools emphasized the close reading of texts, elevating it far above generalizing discussion and speculation about either authorial intention (to say nothing of the author's psychology or biography, which became almost taboo subjects) or reader response: together known as Wimsatt and Beardsley's intentional fallacy and affective fallacy. This emphasis on form and precise attention to "the words themselves" has persisted, after the decline of these critical doctrines themselves.

=== Theory ===
In 1957 Northrop Frye published the influential Anatomy of Criticism. In his works Frye noted that some critics tend to embrace an ideology, and to judge literary pieces on the basis of their adherence to such ideology. This has been a highly influential viewpoint among modern conservative thinkers. E. Michael Jones, for example, argues in his Degenerate Moderns that Stanley Fish was influenced by his own adulterous affairs to reject classic literature that condemned adultery. Jürgen Habermas, in Erkenntnis und Interesse [1968] (Knowledge and Human Interests), described literary critical theory in literary studies as a form of hermeneutics: knowledge via interpretation to understand the meaning of human texts and symbolic expressions – including the interpretation of texts which themselves interpret other texts.

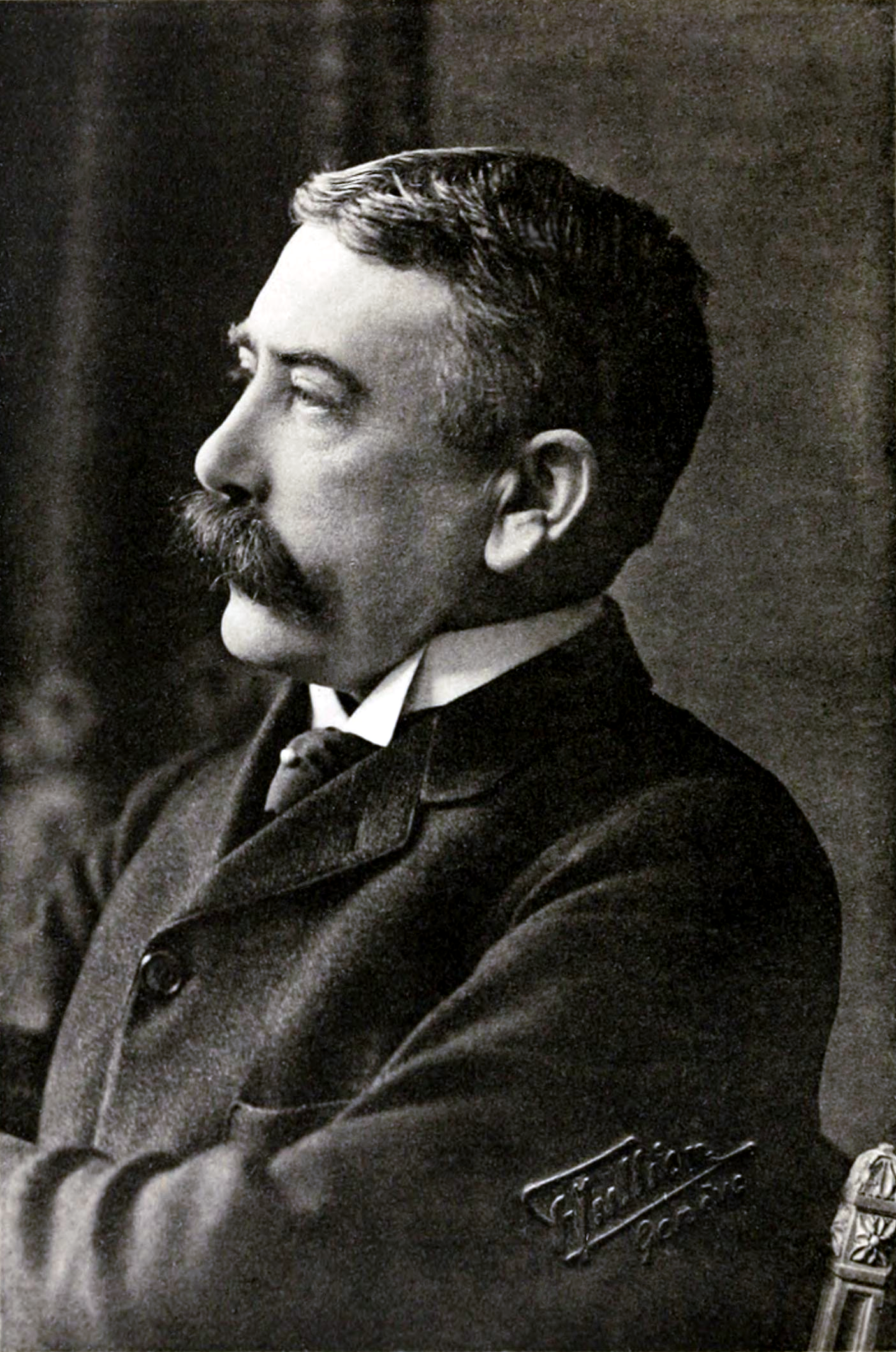
Ferdinand de Saussure's theories of linguistics and semiotics were influential in developing structuralist approach to literary criticism.

In the British and American literary establishment, the New Criticism was more or less dominant until the late 1960s. Around that time Anglo-American university literature departments began to witness a rise of a more explicitly philosophical literary theory, influenced by structuralism, then post-structuralism, and other kinds of Continental philosophy. It continued until the 1990s when interest in "concept" peaked. Many later critics, though undoubtedly still influenced by theoretical work, have been comfortable simply interpreting literature rather than writing explicitly about methodology and philosophical presumptions.

=== Current state ===
Today, approaches based in literary theory and continental philosophy largely coexist in university literature departments, while conventional methods, some informed by the New Critics, also remain active. Disagreements over the goals and methods of literary criticism, which characterized both sides taken by critics during the "rise" of theory, have declined.

Some critics work largely with theoretical texts, while others read traditional literature; interest in the literary canon is still great, but many critics are also interested in nontraditional texts and women's literature, as elaborated on by certain academic journals such as Contemporary Women's Writing, while some critics influenced by cultural studies read popular texts like comic books or pulp/genre fiction. Ecocritics have drawn connections between literature and the natural sciences. Darwinian literary studies studies literature in the context of evolutionary influences on human nature. And postcritique has sought to develop new ways of reading and responding to literary texts that go beyond the interpretive methods of critique. Many literary critics also work in film criticism or media studies.

=== History of the book ===
Related to other forms of literary criticism, the history of the book is a field of an inter-disciplinary inquiry drawing on the methods of bibliography, cultural history, history of literature, and media theory. Principally concerned with the production, circulation, and reception of texts and their material forms, book history seeks to connect forms of textuality with their material aspects.

Among the issues within the history of literature with which book history can be seen to intersect are: the development of authorship as a profession, the formation of reading audiences, the constraints of censorship and copyright, and the economics of literary form.

=== Major twentieth-century schools of critical analysis ===
==== Historicist approaches ====
- New Historicism

==== Formalist approaches ====
- Russian Formalism
- Narratology
- Structuralism
- Post-structuralism
- Deconstructionism
- Literary Modernism
- Post-modernism
- Reader-response criticism
- Semiotic literary criticism
- New Criticism
- Genre studies
- Hermeneutics

==== Political approaches ====
- Marxist literary criticism
- Cultural studies
- Postcolonialism
- Feminist literary criticism
- Ecocriticism

==== Psychological approaches ====
- Archetypal literary criticism
- Phenomenology
- Psychoanalytic literary criticism
- New Humanism

==== Race and sexuality approaches ====
- African-American literature
- Queer theory
- Critical race theory
- Affect theory
- Disability studies

== Key texts ==
=== Classical and medieval periods ===
- Plato: Ion, Republic, Cratylus
- Aristotle: Poetics, Rhetoric
- Horace: Art of Poetry
- Longinus: On the Sublime
- Plotinus: On the Intellectual Beauties
- St. Augustine: On Christian Doctrine
- Boethius: The Consolation of Philosophy
- Aquinas: The Nature and Domain of Sacred Doctrine
- Dante: The Banquet, Letter to Cangrande Della Scala
- Boccaccio: Life of Dante, Genealogy of the Gentile Gods
- Christine de Pizan: The Book of the City of Ladies
- Bharata Muni: Natya Shastra
- Rajashekhara: Inquiry into Literature
- Valmiki: The Invention of Poetry (from the Ramayana)
- Anandavardhana: Light on Suggestion
- Cao Pi: A Discourse on Literature
- Lu Ji: Rhymeprose on Literature
- Liu Xie: The Literary Mind
- Wang Changling: A Discussion of Literature and Meaning
- Sikong Tu: The Twenty-Four Classes of Poetry

=== Renaissance period ===
- Lodovico Castelvetro: The Poetics of Aristotle Translated and Explained
- Joachim du Bellay: La Défense et illustration de la langue française
- Philip Sidney: An Apology for Poetry
- Jacopo Mazzoni: On the Defense of the Comedy of Dante
- Torquato Tasso: Discourses on the Heroic Poem
- Francis Bacon: The Advancement of Learning
- Henry Reynolds: Mythomystes
- John Mandaville: Composed in the mid-14th century – most probably by a french physician

=== Enlightenment period ===
- Thomas Hobbes: Answer to Davenant's preface to Gondibert
- Pierre Corneille: Of the Three Unities of Action, Time, and Place
- John Dryden: An Essay of Dramatic Poesy
- Nicolas Boileau-Despréaux: The Art of Poetry
- John Locke: An Essay Concerning Human Understanding
- John Dennis: The Advancement and Reformation of Modern Poetry
- Alexander Pope: An Essay on Criticism
- Joseph Addison: On the Pleasures of the Imagination (Spectator essays)
- Giambattista Vico: The New Science
- Edmund Burke: A Philosophical Inquiry into the Origins of Our Ideas of the Sublime and the Beautiful
- David Hume: Of the Standard of Taste
- Samuel Johnson: On Fiction, Rasselas, Preface to Shakespeare
- Edward Young: Conjectures on Original Composition
- Gotthold Ephraim Lessing: Laocoön
- Joshua Reynolds: Discourses on Art
- Richard "Conversation" Sharp Letters & Essays in Prose & Verse
- James Usher :Clio: or a Discourse on Taste (1767)
- Denis Diderot: The Paradox of Acting
- Immanuel Kant: Critique of Judgment
- Mary Wollstonecraft: A Vindication of the Rights of Woman
- William Blake: The Marriage of Heaven or Hell, Letter to Thomas Butts, Annotations to Reynolds' Discourses, A Descriptive Catalogue, A Vision of the Last Judgment, On Homer's Poetry
- Friedrich Schiller: Letters on the Aesthetic Education of Man
- Friedrich Schlegel: Critical Fragments, Athenaeum Fragments, On Incomprehensibility

=== 19th century ===
- John Neal: American Writers
- William Wordsworth: Preface to the Second Edition of Lyrical Ballads
- Anne Louise Germaine de Staël: Literature in its Relation to Social Institutions
- Friedrich Wilhelm Joseph Schelling: On the Relation of the Plastic Arts to Nature
- Samuel Taylor Coleridge: Shakespeare's Judgment Equal to His Genius, On the Principles of Genial Criticism, The Statesman's Manual, Biographia Literaria
- Wilhelm von Humboldt: Collected Works
- John Keats: letters to Benjamin Bailey, George & Thomas Keats, John Taylor, and Richard Woodhouse
- Arthur Schopenhauer: The World as Will and Idea
- Thomas Love Peacock: The Four Ages of Poetry
- Percy Bysshe Shelley: A Defence of Poetry
- Johann Wolfgang von Goethe: Conversations with Eckermann, Maxim No. 279
- Georg Wilhelm Friedrich Hegel: The Philosophy of Fine Art
- Giacomo Leopardi: Zibaldone (notebooks)
- Francesco de Sanctis: Critical Essays; History of the Italian Literature
- Thomas Carlyle: Symbols
- John Stuart Mill: What is Poetry?
- Ralph Waldo Emerson: The Poet
- Charles Augustin Sainte-Beuve: What Is a Classic?
- James Russell Lowell: A Fable for Critics
- Edgar Allan Poe: The Poetic Principle
- Matthew Arnold: Preface to the 1853 Edition of Poems, The Function of Criticism at the Present Time, The Study of Poetry
- Hippolyte Taine: History of English Literature and Language
- Charles Baudelaire: The Salon of 1859
- Karl Marx: The German Ideology, Contribution to the Critique of Political Economy
- Søren Kierkegaard: Two Ages: A Literary Review, The Concept of Irony
- Friedrich Nietzsche: The Birth of Tragedy from the Spirit of Music, Truth and Falsity in an Ultramoral Sense
- Walter Pater: Studies in the History of the Renaissance
- Émile Zola: The Experimental Novel
- Anatole France: The Adventures of the Soul
- Oscar Wilde: The Decay of Lying
- Stéphane Mallarmé: The Evolution of Literature, The Book: A Spiritual Mystery, Mystery in Literature
- Leo Tolstoy: What is Art?

=== 20th century ===
- Benedetto Croce: Aesthetic
- Antonio Gramsci : Prison Notebooks
- Umberto Eco: The Aesthetics of Thomas Aquinas; The Open Work
- A. C. Bradley: Poetry for Poetry's Sake
- Sigmund Freud: Creative Writers and Daydreaming
- Ferdinand de Saussure: Course in General Linguistics
- Claude Lévi-Strauss: The Structural Study of Myth
- T. E. Hulme: Romanticism and Classicism; Bergson's Theory of Art
- Walter Benjamin: On Language as Such and On the Language of Man
- Viktor Shklovsky: Art as Technique
- T. S. Eliot: Tradition and the Individual Talent; Hamlet and His Problems
- Irving Babbitt: Romantic Melancholy
- Carl Jung: On the Relation of Analytical Psychology to Poetry
- Leon Trotsky: The Formalist School of Poetry and Marxism
- Boris Eikhenbaum: The Theory of the "Formal Method"
- Virginia Woolf: A Room of One's Own
- I. A. Richards: Practical Criticism
- Mikhail Bakhtin: Epic and Novel: Toward a Methodology for the Study of the Novel
- Georges Bataille: The Notion of Expenditure
- John Crowe Ransom: Poetry: A Note in Ontology; Criticism as Pure Speculation
- R. P. Blackmur: A Critic's Job of Work
- Jacques Lacan: The Mirror Stage as Formative of the Function of the I as Revealed in Psychoanalytic Experience; The Agency of the Letter in the Unconscious or Reason Since Freud
- György Lukács: The Ideal of the Harmonious Man in Bourgeois Aesthetics; Art and Objective Truth
- Paul Valéry: Poetry and Abstract Thought
- Kenneth Burke: Literature as Equipment for Living
- Ernst Cassirer: Art
- W. K. Wimsatt and Monroe Beardsley: The Intentional Fallacy, The Affective Fallacy
- Cleanth Brooks: The Heresy of Paraphrase; Irony as a Principle of Structure
- Jan Mukařovský: Standard Language and Poetic Language
- Jean-Paul Sartre: Why Write?
- Simone de Beauvoir: The Second Sex
- Ronald Crane: Toward a More Adequate Criticism of Poetic Structure
- Philip Wheelwright: The Burning Fountain
- Theodor Adorno: Cultural Criticism and Society; Aesthetic Theory
- Roman Jakobson: The Metaphoric and Metonymic Poles
- Northrop Frye: Anatomy of Criticism; The Critical Path
- Gaston Bachelard: The Poetics of Space
- Ernst Gombrich: Art and Illusion
- Martin Heidegger: The Nature of Language; Language in the Poem; Hölderlin and the Essence of Poetry
- E. D. Hirsch Jr.: Objective Interpretation
- Noam Chomsky: Aspects of the Theory of Syntax
- Jacques Derrida: Structure, Sign, and Play in the Discourse of the Human Sciences
- Roland Barthes: The Structuralist Activity; The Death of the Author
- Michel Foucault: Truth and Power; What Is an Author?; The Discourse on Language
- Hans Robert Jauss: Literary History as a Challenge to Literary Theory
- Georges Poulet: Phenomenology of Reading
- Raymond Williams: The Country and the City
- Lionel Trilling: The Liberal Imagination;
- Julia Kristeva: From One Identity to Another; Women's Time
- Paul de Man: Semiology and Rhetoric; The Rhetoric of Temporality
- Harold Bloom: The Anxiety of Influence; The Dialectics of Poetic Tradition; Poetry, Revisionism, Repression
- Chinua Achebe: Colonialist Criticism
- Stanley Fish: Normal Circumstances, Literal Language, Direct Speech Acts, the Ordinary, the Everyday, the Obvious, What Goes Without Saying, and Other Special Cases; Is There a Text in This Class?
- Edward Said: The World, the Text, and the Critic; Secular Criticism
- Elaine Showalter: Toward a Feminist Poetics
- Sandra Gilbert and Susan Gubar: Infection in the Sentence; The Madwoman in the Attic
- Murray Krieger: "A Waking Dream": The Symbolic Alternative to Allegory
- Gilles Deleuze and Félix Guattari: Anti-Oedipus: Capitalism and Schizophrenia
- René Girard: The Sacrificial Crisis
- Hélène Cixous: The Laugh of the Medusa
- Jonathan Culler: Beyond Interpretation
- Geoffrey Hartman: Literary Commentary as Literature
- Wolfgang Iser: The Repertoire
- Hayden White: The Historical Text as Literary Artifact
- Hans-Georg Gadamer: Truth and Method
- Paul Ricoeur: The Metaphorical Process as Cognition, Imagination, and Feeling
- Peter Szondi: On Textual Understanding
- M. H. Abrams: How to Do Things with Texts
- J. Hillis Miller: The Critic as Host
- Clifford Geertz: Blurred Genres: The Refiguration of Social Thought
- Filippo Tommaso Marinetti: The Foundation and Manifesto of Futurism
- Tristan Tzara: Unpretentious Proclamation
- André Breton: The Surrealist Manifesto; The Declaration of 27 January 1925
- Mina Loy: Feminist Manifesto
- Yokomitsu Riichi: Sensation and New Sensation
- Oswald de Andrade: Cannibalist Manifesto
- André Breton, Leon Trotsky and Diego Rivera: Manifesto: Towards a Free Revolutionary Art
- Hu Shih: Some Modest Proposals for the Reform of Literature
- Octavio Paz: The Bow and the Lire

== See also ==
- Book review
- Comparative literature
- Critical lens
- Genre studies
- History of the book
- Literary critics
- Literary translation
- Philosophy and literature
- Poetic tradition
- Social criticism
- Translation criticism
