= Helen Moore =

Helen Moore may refer to:

- Helen Moore (literary scholar) (born 1970), literary scholar and university administrator
- Helen Moore (mathematician)
- Helen A. Moore, American feminist sociologist
- Helen Edmunds Moore (1881–1968), Texas politician
- Helen Moore (nurse) (1906–1995), matron-in-chief, Queen Alexandra's Royal Naval Nursing Service, 1959–1962
- Helen Moore (1894–1963), mathematician, dean of women at Kansas State University, and namesake of Moore Hall (Kansas State University)
- Helen Moore (1899–1971), American baseball coach-chaperone for the South Bend Blue Sox
- Helen Moore (died 1996), wife and killer of jazz trumpeter Lee Morgan
- Helen Moore Barthelme (1927–2002), wife and biographer of fiction author Donald Barthelme
- Helen Mason Moore (1907–2003), headmistress of The Ellis School in Pittsburgh, Pennsylvania from 1962 to 1971
- Helen Vincent Moore (1830–1903), namesake of the John and Helen Moore House in Oregon

== See also ==
- Helen Moore, fictional character in New Zealand television drama Orange Roughies
- "Helen Moore", episode of television crime drama Snapped
