= Warren Porter =

Warren Porter may refer to:

- Warren R. Porter, politician from California
- Warren P. Porter, biophysical ecologist and environmental toxicologist
