= Joel Best =

American academic in sociology and criminology

Joel Gordon Best
- Known for: Criminology; Collective behavior; Deviance and Social Control; Fads and Fashions; Popular Culture; Social Problems

Academic background
- Education: University of California, Berkeley (MA, PhD); University of Minnesota (BA, MA)

Academic work
- Institutions: University of Delaware; Southern Illinois University at Carbondale; Kwansei Gakuin University; California State University, Fresno; Concordia College
- Website: www.joelbest.net

Joel Gordon Best is an American sociologist and criminologist. He is a Professor Emeritus and a Francis Alison award winner in the Department of Sociology and Criminal Justice at the University of Delaware. He specialized in social problems and deviance. His most recent research focused on social problems theory.

He earned a Bachelor of Arts in sociology and psychology in 1967, before studying sociology at the University of California, Berkeley, from which he earned a Master of Arts (MA) in 1968 and a Doctor of Philosophy in 1971. In 1979, he earned an MA in United States history from the University of Minnesota.

He taught at Concordia College (1969–70), California State University, Fresno (1970–91), Southern Illinois University at Carbondale (1991–99), and the University of Delaware (1999–2023).

He served as a President of the Midwest Sociological Society (1999–2000) and the Society for the Study of Social Problems (2001–02), and was an editor of the journal Social Problems. When asked about his prolific output, Best responded, “If you write a page per day, or every few days, you will have a book by the end of the year.”

He is best known for his research on Halloween sadism (the belief that people distribute contaminated treats to trick-or-treaters). Having studied press coverage since 1958, Best has been unable to locate any evidence that any child has been killed or seriously injured by a contaminated treat picked up during trick-or-treating.

== Books ==
=== As author ===
- Best, Joel; Luckenbill, David F. (1982). Organizing Deviance. Englewood Cliffs, N.J: Prentice-Hall. ISBN 978-0-13-641605-0.
- Best, Joel; Best, Eric (2014). The Student Loan Mess: How Good Intentions Created a Trillion-Dollar Problem. Berkeley, California: University of California Press. ISBN 9780520287525.
- Best, Joel; Bogle, Kathleen A. (2014). Kids Gone Wild From Rainbow Parties to Sexting, Understanding the Hype Over Teen Sex. New York: New York University Press. ISBN 978-0-8147-6073-4.
  - Winner Brian McConnell Book Award, International Society for Contemporary Legend Research
- Best, Joel (1998). Controlling Vice: Regulating Brothel Prostitution in St. Paul, 1865-1883. Columbus: Ohio State University Press. ISBN 978-0-8142-5007-5.
- Best, Joel (2012). Damned Lies and Statistics: Untangling Numbers from the Media, Politicians, and Activists. Berkeley, CA: University of California Press. ISBN 978-0-520-27470-9.
- Best, Joel (2004). More Damned Lies and Statistics: How Numbers Confuse Public Issues. Berkeley: University of California Press. ISBN 978-0-520-93002-5.
- Best, Joel (2004). Deviance: Career of a Concept. Belmont, CA: Thomson/Wadsworth. ISBN 978-0-534-57001-9.
- Best, Joel (2011). Everyone's a Winner: Life in Our Congratulatory Culture. Berkeley: University of California Press. ISBN 978-0-520-26716-9.
- Best, Joel (2006). Flavor of the Month: Why Smart People Fall for Fads. Berkeley, CA: University of California Press. ISBN 978-0-520-24626-3.
- Best, Joel (2021). Is that True? Critical Thinking for Sociologists. Oakland, California: University of California Press. ISBN 978-0-520-38141-4.
- Best, Joel (2025). Just the Facts: Untangling Contradictory Claims (1 ed.). Oaklands, California: University of California Press. ISBN 978-0-52042132-5.
- Best, Joel (1999). Random Violence: How We Talk about New Crimes and New Victims. Berkeley: University of California Press. ISBN 978-0-520-21571-9.
- Best, Joel (2007). Social problems (1st ed.). New York London: W. W. Norton & Company. ISBN 978-0-39392877-8.
  - Best, Joel (2013). Social problems (2nd ed.). New York London: W. W. Norton & Company. ISBN 978-0-39391863-2.
  - Best, Joel (2017). Social Problems (3rd ed.). New York London: W. W. Norton & Company. ISBN 978-0-39328341-9.
  - Best, Joel (2020). Social Problems (4th ed.). New York London: W. W. Norton & Company. ISBN 978-0-39353304-0.
  - Best, Joel; Monahan, Brian (2025). Social Problems (5th ed.). New York London: W.W. Norton & Company. ISBN 978-1-324-08587-4.
- Best, Joel (2013). Stat-Spotting: A Field Guide to Identifying Dubious Data. Berkeley: University of California Press. ISBN 978-0-520-27998-8.
- Best, Joel (2011). The Stupidity Epidemic: Worrying about Students, Schools, and America's Future. Framing 21st century social issues. New York London: Routledge. ISBN 978-0-415-89209-4.
- Best, Joel (1990). Threatened Children: Rhetoric and Concern about Child-Victims. Chicago: University of Chicago Press. ISBN 978-0-226-04425-5.
  - Winner, Charles Horton Cooley Award, Society for the Study of Symbolic Interaction, 1991

=== As editor ===
- Best, Joel; Richardson, James T.; Bromley, David G., eds. (1991). The Satanism Scare. Somerset: Taylor and Francis. ISBN 978-0-202-30378-9.
- Best, Joel, ed. (1994). Troubling Children: Studies of Children and Social Problems. New York: Aldine de Gruyter. ISBN 978-0-202-30491-5.
- Best, Joel, ed. (2001). How Claims Spread: Cross-National Diffusion of Social Problems. Social problems and social issues. New York: Aldine de Gruyter. ISBN 978-0-202-30653-7.
- Best, Joel (1989). Images of Issues: Typifying Contemporary Social Problems (1 ed.). Hawthorne, New York: Aldine de Gruyter. ISBN 0-202-30352-7.
  - Best, Joel, ed. (1989). Images of Issues: Typifying Contemporary Social Problems. Social problems and social issues (2nd ed.). New York: A. De Gruyter. ISBN 978-0-202-30538-7.
- Best, Joel; Harris, Scott R., eds. (2013). Making Sense of Social Problems: New Images, New Issues. Boulder: Lynne Rienner Publishers. ISBN 978-1-58826-855-6.
