= Midwest Sociological Society =

US regional professional society for sociologists

- Formation: 1936
- Headquarters: Bellevue, Nebraska
- Key people: Jennifer Talarico (Executive director)
- Website: https://themss.org/

The Midwest Sociological Society (MSS) is a professional organization for academic and applied sociologists as well as students of the discipline to promote interest in and advance knowledge of sociologists. The society was founded in 1936 and held its first annual meeting in 1937. In 2011–2012 its membership marked its 75th anniversary at annual meetings held in St Louis and Minneapolis.

While membership of the society is open to everyone, the majority of its 1300 members (2/3) are from the Midwest.

The society publishes the scholarly journal, The Sociological Quarterly; holds an annual meeting each spring; supports fellowship, grant, and award programs; and supports research by its members.

== Presidents ==
Past presidents of the Midwest Sociological Society
| Name | Term |
|---|---|
| L. Guy Brown | 1937 |
| J. O. Hertzler | 1937–38 |
| Noel P. Gist | 1938–39 |
| Leslie D. Zeleny | 1939–40 |
| Clyde W. Hart | 1940–41 |
| Carrol D. Clark | 1941–42 |
| James M. Reinhardt | 1942–44 |
| David E. Lindstrom | 1944–45 |
| Ernest Manheim | 1945–46 |
| Howard P. Becker | 1946–47 |
| T. Earl Suellenger | 1947 |
| Lloyd V. Ballard | 1947–48 |
| Ray E. Wakeley | 1948–49 |
| George V. Vold | 1949–50 |
| Thomas D. Eliot | 1950–51 |
| J. Howell Atwood | 1951–52 |
| Donald O. Cowgill | 1952–53 |
| William H. Sewell | 1953–54 |
| John H. Burma | 1954–55 |
| Harold W. Saunders | 1955–56 |
| C. Terrence Pihlblad | 1956–57 |
| Paul Meadows | 1957–58 |
| Elio D. Monachesi | 1958–59 |
| Paul J. Campisi | 1959–60 |
| Ruth Shonle Cavan | 1960–61 |
| Arnold M. Rose | 1961–62 |
| Manford H. Kuhn | 1962–63 |
| Alan P. Bates | 1963–64 |
| Robert L. McNamara | 1964–65 |
| Marshall B. Clinard | 1965–66 |
| William L. Kolb | 1966–67 |
| Raymond Mack | 1967–68 |
| Robert W. Habenstein | 1968–69 |
| Nicholas Babchuk | 1969–70 |
| Roy G. Francis | 1970–71 |
| Ira Reiss | 1971–72 |
| Robert F. Winch | 1972–73 |
| Carolyn Rose | 1973–74 |
| Warren A. Peterson | 1974–75 |
| Helena Z. Lopata | 1975–76 |
| Richard H. Hall | 1976–77 |
| Charles K. Warriner | 1977–78 |
| Scott Greer | 1978–79 |
| Joan Huber | 1979–80 |
| Ethel Shanas | 1980–81 |
| Hans O. Mauksch | 1981–82 |
| Scott G. McNall | 1982–83 |
| James L. McCartney | 1983–84 |
| Michael Aiken | 1984–85 |
| Peter M. Hall | 1985–86 |
| John P. Clark | 1986–87 |
| Kathleen S. Crittenden | 1987–88 |
| Norman K. Denzin | 1988–89 |
| Roberta G. Simmons | 1989–90 |
| Alan Booth | 1990–91 |
| Susan E. Wright | 1991–92 |
| Clark McPhail | 1992–93 |
| Carl Couch | 1993–94 |
| Richard T. Schaefer | 1994–95 |
| Barbara S. Heyl | 1995–96 |
| Anthony M. Orum | 1996–97 |
| R. Dean Wright | 1997–98 |
| Joanne Nagel | 1998–99 |
| Joel Best | 1999–00 |
| John E. Farley | 2000–01 |
| Gary Alan Fine | 2001–02 |
| Philip Olson | 2002–03 |
| Chris Prendergast | 2003–04 |
| Eleanor Miller | 2004–05 |
| Robert Benford | 2005–06 |
| Patricia & Peter Adler | 2006–07 |
| Helen A. Moore | 2007–08 |
| Susan Stall | 2008–09 |
| Diane Pike | 2009–10 |
| Peter Kivisto | 2010–11 |
| Mary Zimmerman | 2011–12 |
| Linda Lindsey | 2012–13 |
| Barbara Keating | 2013–14 |
| Kevin Leicht | 2014-15 |
| Doug Hatmann | 2015-16 |
| Deborah White | 2016-17 |
| Phyllis Baker | 2017-18 |
| Marlynn May | 2018-19 |
| Tom Gerschick | 2019-20 |
| Julie Pelton | 2020-21 |
