= Robert A. Gross (historian) =

American historian

Robert Alan Gross (born Bridgeport, Connecticut) is an American historian, and is an emeritus faculty member at the University of Connecticut.

== Life ==
Gross graduated from the University of Pennsylvania in 1966, and later earned an M.A from Columbia University in 1968, followed by a Ph.D. in 1976. He taught at Amherst College from 1976 to 1988, at the University of Sussex from 1981 to 1983, and the College of William and Mary from 1988 to 2003. He also served as the James L. and Shirley A. Draper Professor of Early American History at the University of Connecticut.

Gross has written on themes such as multiculturalism and transnationalism in American thought and life.

His work has been featured in Newsweek, Harper's, Saturday Review, and Book World.

== Awards ==
- 1977 Bancroft Prize
- 1979 Guggenheim Fellowship
- Howard Fellowship
- Rockefeller Foundations Fellowship
- National Endowment for the Humanities grant
- American Antiquarian Society grant

== Works ==
- The Minutemen and Their World (1976) (reprint Hill and Wang, 2001, ISBN 978-0-8090-0120-0)
- In Debt to Shays: The Bicentennial of an Agrarian Rebellion. University Press of Virginia. 1993. ISBN 978-0-8139-1353-7.
- The Transcendentalists and Their World. Farrar, Straus and Giroux. 2021. ISBN 978-0-3742-7932-5.
