= Lowell S. Brown =

American physicist (1934–2023)

- Born: February 15, 1934
- Died: April 5, 2023 (aged 89)
- Education: University of California, Berkeley; Harvard University
- Awards: Guggenheim Foundation Fellow; NSF Senior Postdoctoral Fellow; NSF Postdoctoral Fellow; NSF Predoctoral Fellow; Laboratory Fellow
- Scientific career
- Fields: Quantum field theory
- Workplaces: Yale University; University of Washington; Los Alamos National Laboratory
- Doctoral advisor: Julian Schwinger

Lowell S. Brown (February 15, 1934 – April 5, 2023) was an American theoretical physicist who was a staff scientist and laboratory fellow at Los Alamos National Laboratory, and professor emeritus of physics at University of Washington. He was a student of Julian Schwinger at Harvard University and a recipient of the John Simon Guggenheim Memorial Foundation Fellowship. Brown authored a book on Quantum Field Theory that has received over 5,000 citations, and authored or co-authored over 150 articles that have accumulated over 11,000 citations. Brown died on April 5, 2023, at the age of 89.

== Education and career ==
Lowell S. Brown earned his A.B. in physics from the University of California, Berkeley in 1956 and his Ph.D. in physics from Harvard University in 1961, with a National Science Foundation Predoctoral Fellowship, studying quantum field theory under Julian Schwinger.

After National Science Foundation Postdoctoral Fellowships at Istituto di Fisica Dell'Universita in Rome and at Imperial College of Science and Technology in London, Brown joined Yale University as an associate professor through 1968. For most of his career, Brown served as a professor at the University of Washington (1969–2001). Then, he was a staff scientist at Los Alamos National Laboratory (LANL) in New Mexico (2001–2014), having been named laboratory fellow in 2009. He remained guest scientist at LANL until his death.

Brown again visited Imperial College in 1971-1972, continuing his research with a National Science Foundation Senior Postdoctoral Fellowship. He was awarded a John Simon Guggenheim Memorial Foundation Fellowship in 1979 and undertook his research at the European Organization for Nuclear Research (CERN), Geneva, Switzerland, and the Institute for Advanced Study, Princeton, New Jersey.

== Scientific contributions ==
Most of Brown's work has involved quantum field theory applied to elementary particle physics, astrophysics, general relativity, plasma physics, atomic physics, and nuclear physics.

His book "Quantum Field Theory" (1994) has been well received. Pierre Ramond's review in Science states that Brown's book is "marked by its astute choice of topics as well as by the clarity with which they are expounded, it is akin to a toolbox for students of modern quantum field theory... a very thorough and rare treatment...a very interesting and original textbook. I strongly recommend this book to whoever aspires to become either a particle or a condensed matter physicist."

Brown's work on the interaction of intense laser beams with electrons (Brown & Kibble 1964) is still cited forty or so years later.

In astrophysics and general relativity, his work on the stress–energy tensor of various fields coupled to an arbitrary classical gravitational field (1977) is noteworthy: it uses the method of dimensional continuation and proper time representations, and with these methods, he computed the unique gravitational anomaly for scalar fields and the anomaly for vector fields (Brown & Cassidy 1977).

Brown and collaborators computed the energy–energy correlation in electron–positron annihilation (Basham et al. 1978), which provides one method of measuring the strong interaction QCD coupling constant.

Brown was the first to compute the stress–energy tensor between conducting planes (Brown & Maclay 1969). The stress tensor evaluated on a plane yields the Casimir force.

Brown was the first to exhibit the classical limit of the hydrogen atom (1973). He constructed large-quantum-number wave packets that slowly spread while moving in circular orbits.

At the University of Washington, Hans Dehmelt captured single charged particles in very stable orbits in a Penning trap. This arrangement, called geonium, enabled measurement of the magnetic moment of the electron with exquisite precision for which Dehmelt won the Nobel Prize. Brown became fascinated with this new experimental procedure and with coworkers wrote many papers investigating the detailed workings of geonium. His work culminated in a long review article (Brown & Gabrielse 1986) that has become a handbook for other experimenters who use a Penning trap.

Brown also investigated plasma effects on nuclear fusion (Brown & Sawyer 1997), wrote a paper applying field theory to plasma physics (Brown & Yaffe 2001), obtained the non-leading corrections in plasma stopping power (Brown et al. 2005), and provided an effective field description for deuterium-tritium fusion (Brown & Hale 2014).

== Publications ==
=== Book ===
- Brown, Lowell S. (1994). Quantum Field Theory. Cambridge University Press. ISBN 978-0-521-46946-3.

=== Cited articles ===
- Brown, L. S.; Kibble, T. W. B. (1964). "Interaction of intense laser beams with electrons". Physical Review. 133 (3A): a705. Bibcode:1964PhRv..133..705B. doi:10.1103/physrev.133.a705.
- Brown, L. S. (1977). "Stress-tensor trace anomaly in a gravitational metric: Scalar fields". Physical Review D. 15 (6): 1469–1483. Bibcode:1977PhRvD..15.1469B. doi:10.1103/physrevd.15.1469.
- Brown, L. S.; Cassidy, J. P. (1977). "Stress-tensor trace anomaly in a gravitational metric: General theory, Maxwell field". Physical Review D. 15 (10): 2810. Bibcode:1977PhRvD..15.2810B. doi:10.1103/physrevd.15.2810.
- Basham, C. L.; Brown, L. S.; Ellis, S. D.; Love, S. T. (1978). "Energy Correlations in Electron–Positron Annihilation: Testing Quantum Chromodynamics". Physical Review Letters. 41 (23): 1585. Bibcode:1978PhRvL..41.1585B. doi:10.1103/physrevlett.41.1585.
- Basham, C. L.; Brown, L. S.; Ellis, S. D.; Love, S. T. (1979). "Energy correlations in electron–positron annihilation in quantum chromodynamics: Asymptotically free perturbation theory". Physical Review D. 19 (7): 2018. Bibcode:1979PhRvD..19.2018B. doi:10.1103/physrevd.19.2018. S2CID 121310426.
- Brown, L. S.; Maclay, G. J. (1969). "Vacuum stress between conducting plates: an image solution". Physical Review. 184 (5): 1272. Bibcode:1969PhRv..184.1272B. doi:10.1103/physrev.184.1272.
- Brown, L. S. (1973). "Classical limit of the hydrogen atom". American Journal of Physics. 41 (4): 525–530. Bibcode:1973AmJPh..41..525B. doi:10.1119/1.1987282.
- Brown, L. S.; Gabrielse, G. (1986). "Geonium theory: Physics of a single electron or ion in a Penning trap". Reviews of Modern Physics. 58 (1): 233–312. Bibcode:1986RvMP...58..233B. doi:10.1103/revmodphys.58.233.
- Brown, L. S.; Sawyer, R. F. (1997). "Nuclear reaction rates in a plasma". Reviews of Modern Physics. 69 (2): 411–436. arXiv:astro-ph/9610256. Bibcode:1997RvMP...69..411B. doi:10.1103/revmodphys.69.411. S2CID 16992520.
- Brown, L. S.; Yaffe, L. J. (2001). "Effective field theory for highly ionized plasmas". Physics Reports. 340 (1): 1–164. arXiv:physics/9911055. Bibcode:2001PhR...340....1B. doi:10.1016/s0370-1573(00)00068-5. S2CID 119498790.
- Brown, L. S.; Preston, D. L.; Singleton Jr., R. L. (2005). "Charged particle motion in a highly ionized plasma". Physics Reports. 410 (4): 237–333. arXiv:physics/0501084. Bibcode:2005PhR...410..237B. doi:10.1016/j.physrep.2005.01.001. S2CID 119344275.
- Brown, L. S.; Hale, G. M. (2014). "Field theory of the d+ t → n+ α reaction dominated by a 5 He* unstable particle". Physical Review C. 89 (1) 014622. arXiv:1308.0347. Bibcode:2014PhRvC..89a4622B. doi:10.1103/physrevc.89.014622. S2CID 118723681.

== Professional society activities ==
Brown served on many committees of the American Physical Society and was the first academic editor of Physical Review D. During his tenure (1987–1995), he was instrumental in incorporating author-prepared electronic manuscripts into the journal's editorial and publishing process, and he conceived and promoted an early version of the electronic status inquiry system for authors.

Additional activities:

- Los Alamos National Laboratory: consultant (1974–2001); Theoretical Division external advisory committee, member (1990–1993)
- U.S. D.O.E. Technical Assessment Committee on University Programs, chairman, Theoretical Physics Panel (1982–1983)
- Physics Survey of National Research Council, member, Elementary Particle Physics Panel (1983–1985)
- Aspen Center for Physics: member, board of trustees (1982–1988); member, advisory board (1988–1990); General Member (1990-present)
- Theoretical Advanced Study Institute in Elementary Particle Physics, member, scientific advisory board (1984–1989)
- Comments on Nuclear and Particle Physics, correspondent (1984–1992)

== Honors and awards ==
- John Simon Guggenheim Memorial Foundation Fellowship for physics research (1979)
- Fellow of the American Physical Society (1968)
- Fellow of the American Association for the Advancement of Science (1995)
- Laboratory Fellow of Los Alamos National Laboratory (2009)
- Phi Beta Kappa (1956)
- Sigma Xi (1956)
