= The Sociological Quarterly =

- Discipline: Sociology
- Language: English
- Edited by: Jonathan S Coley

Publication details
- History: 1960-present
- Publisher: Routledge for the Midwest Sociological Society
- Frequency: Quarterly
- Impact factor: 2.459 (2020)

Standard abbreviations
- ISO 4: Sociol. Q.

Indexing
- CODEN: SOLQAR
- ISSN: 0038-0253 (print); 1533-8525 (web)
- LCCN: 64005249
- OCLC no.: 1644316

Links
- Journal homepage; Online access; Online archive

The Sociological Quarterly (TSQ) is a quarterly peer-reviewed academic journal published by Taylor and Francis for the Midwest Sociological Society. It covers all areas of sociology and publishes both quantitative and qualitative research. The current editor-in-chief is Jonathan S. Coley (Oklahoma State University).

The Quarterly started in 1939 as The Midwest Sociologist, making TSQ among the oldest broad interest sociological journals in the U.S. Previous editors of TSQ were:

- Lloyd V. Ballard (1939-1941)
- J. Howell Atwood (1941-1943)
- Clyde W. Hart & E.B. Reuter (acting) (1943-1944)
- Marguerite I. Reiss (1944-1945)
- Joseph G. Gittler (1945-1948)
- John H. Burma (1948-1952)
- Paul Meadows (1953-1956)
- Paul J. Campisi (1956-1959)

In 1959, the title changed to The Sociological Quarterly, with the following editors having served since then:

- Joseph K. Johnson (1959-1960)
- Paul J. Campisi (1960-1963)
- Peter Munch (1963-1964)
- Paul J. Campisi (1965-1969)
- Robert W. Habenstein (1969-1971)
- James L. McCartney (1971-1977)
- Jerry Gaston (1978-1981)
- Thomas G. Eynon & Herman R. Lantz (1981-1984)
- Gary L. Albrecht (1985-1988)
- George McCall (1989-1992)
- Norman K. Denzin (1992-2000)
- Kevin Leicht (2001-2004)
- Peter Kivisto (2005-2008)
- Brian Donovan & William G. Staples (2009-2012)
- Lisa Waldner & Betty Dobratz (2013-2016)
- Peter M. Hall, Michael G. Lacy, & N. Prabha Unnithan (2017-2020)
- Michael A. Long, Andrew S. Fullerton, & Deputy Editor Jonathan S. Coley (2020 - 2024)
- Jonathan S. Coley (2024 - current)

According to the Journal Citation Reports, the journal has a 2019 5-year impact factor of 2.459.
