= Ira Reiss =

American sociologist (1925–2024)

Ira L. Reiss
- Ira Reiss May 2012
- Born: December 8, 1925; New York City, New York, U.S.
- Died: January 9, 2024 (aged 98); Minneapolis, Minnesota, U.S.
- Education: Pennsylvania State University
- Scientific career
- Fields: Sociology
- Workplaces: University of Minnesota

Ira Leonard Reiss (December 8, 1925 – January 9, 2024) was an American sociologist with primary interests in studying the way society impacts sexual attitudes and behaviors and how people respond to those pressures. He also had interests in the study of gender and family, particularly as they relate to sexuality. He attended Syracuse University for his B.S. degree and the Pennsylvania State University for his M. A. and Ph. D. degrees. His major area in graduate school was sociology and his minor areas were cultural anthropology and philosophy. His doctoral course work in sociology and philosophy was done at Columbia University and his French and German language study was taken at Yale University.

== Overview ==
Reiss taught at Bowdoin College (1953–1955), College of William and Mary (1955–1959), Bard College (1959–1961), the University of Iowa (1961–1969) and the University of Minnesota (1969–1996). He retired as Professor Emeritus in June 1996 but his professional work has continued. He has won a number of awards for his research and theory efforts. He was elected President of the International Academy of Sex Research, The Society for the Scientific Study of Sexuality, The National Council on Family Relations and the Midwest Sociological Society. His teaching was ranked in the top segment of the sociology department at both the University of Iowa and the University of Minnesota and he was nominated for the University wide distinguished teacher awards at both those Universities. Reiss received an award for mentoring from both the undergraduate students and the graduate students at the University of Minnesota. He wrote 14 books, four monographs and over 150 professional papers.

Reiss died in Minneapolis, Minnesota, on January 9, 2024, at the age of 98.

=== Professional interests ===
Reiss's major goal was to promulgate a broad view of science and to shape the study of sexuality to fit that pluralistic perspective of scientific work. He stressed the importance of building theoretical explanations because he felt that theory opens pathways that enable us to understand and to contain our many sexual problem areas. Reiss supported both a sociological and a multidisciplinary approach to sexual phenomena. His major theoretical work is discussed in the parts that follow and involve explanations of premarital sexuality, extramarital sexuality, cross cultural sexuality, and pluralistic sexual values that allow people to promote more rational input into our sexual attitudes and behavior.

Reiss supported the development of a multidisciplinary sexual science field with its own Ph.D. program at a major university. He saw the Ph.D. degree as affording legitimacy to the field of sexual science and enhancing the ability to move the study of sexuality from the role of an orphan in other fields to that of a discipline with its own home and core agenda.

In 2005 Ira and Harriet Reiss founded the Reiss Theory Award for the best social science theory article, chapter or book of the year. The award is jointly sponsored by the Foundation for the Scientific Study of Sexuality (FSSS) and the Society for the Scientific Study of Sexuality (SSSS) and is given each year at the annual meeting of SSSS.

== Professional work ==
=== The Autonomy Theory ===
Reiss established his reputation as a major figure in the social science study of human sexuality in his writings on premarital sexuality. He felt that Alfred Kinsey had focused on the area of behavior and neglected the importance of sexual attitudes and standards. Starting in the late 1950s he developed a scale that measured a person's degree of premarital sexual permissiveness. The scale became one of the most popular scales in the country used in premarital sexual research. The revised short form of the vaginal intercourse scale is still in use. He predicted the sexual revolution of the 1960s and 1970s and described how it would change our premarital sexual customs. Reiss early on sought to discover what socio/cultural factors altered people's level of premarital sexual permissiveness. He received three National Institute of Mental Health research grants (1960–1964) to carry out his studies. To test his scales and his explanations he used a nationally representative sample of the U.S. and also representative samples from two high schools and four colleges. His explanation of sexual permissiveness in America stressed the importance of the autonomy of women and of children as a major factor in the sexual revolution of the 1960s and 1970s. His predictions based on this theory regarding changes in women's sexuality and other changes have largely been supported.

=== Integrating sexual science into family textbooks ===
In 1971 he published his textbook on the family and it became one of the best selling texts in the country and went into four editions. His textbook brought in premarital, marital and extramarital sexuality and homosexual and heterosexual aspects as well as love and gender factors, much more than any of the other textbooks in the family field had done. His definitions of family and marriage stressed the essential elements of these institutions and contained a wide variety of types of family and marital systems. The text had a cross cultural and historical emphasis and a research and theory base for the explanatory concepts that were developed.

=== Determinants of extramarital sexual permissiveness ===
In 1980 Reiss and two of his colleagues published a research and theory paper on factors that predicted a person's attitudes towards extramarital sexuality. The article won the 1980 Reuben Hill award as the best publication on theory and methods in the family area. The paper was based on the results of studying four nationally representative samples of the U.S. fielded by the National Opinion Research Center. The findings indicated that the degree of intellectual flexibility in a person's thinking and the general acceptance of sexuality as a positive part of life were major direct determinants of the degree of acceptance of extramarital permissiveness. Although less influential, the overall quality of the marital relationship was also important. Reiss has published a scale that can be used to measure extramarital sexual permissiveness.

=== The Cross Cultural Sexual Linkage Theory ===
Perhaps the most challenging research and theory project was Reiss's development of a cross cultural explanation that would specify the universal aspects that organize and shape our sexual lives in all societies, i.e., how sexuality knits into the social fabric. The project fascinated Reiss and he spent five years searching through the studies that had been carried out regarding sexuality in other societies—both developed societies and developing societies. He used the Standard Cross Cultural Sample of the 186 best studied non-industrial societies in the world and also used research done on today's industrial societies. He published his research and theoretical explanation in his 1986 book. The universal linkages to sexuality that were found in all societies came from three socio/cultural segments: the degree of gender power differences, the ideologies concerning what is considered normal and the degree of marital sexual jealousy. These three elements were the basis of his Linkage Theory explaining differences and similarities in how sexuality was viewed in various societies. The gender power difference in a society was seen as the most powerful influence on sexual customs since it influences the other two linkages. Changes in sexual customs in the Western World generally supports this theory.

=== The HER Sexual Pluralism Theory ===
The spread of HIV/AIDS in the United States led to Reiss's decision to compare the U. S. to other western societies so as to understand why it has such high rates of sexual problems such as HIV/AIDS, teen pregnancy, rape, and child sexual abuse. His wife, Harriet, worked closely with him on this book and she is a co-author. They examined national data from several Western European countries as well as from the United States. They discovered that those countries in Europe with very low rates of sexual problems were countries with a high degree of sexual pluralism, i.e., a broad acceptance of sexual attitudes and behaviors. The Western European countries highest on sexual pluralism were the Scandinavian cultures and the Netherlands. The sexual ethic that was growing in those countries was conceptualized as HER Sexual Pluralism. HER stands for honest, equal, and responsible. Those sexual relations that have HER qualities are considered ethical in these Western societies.

The evidence indicated that the restrictive aspects of American traditional attitudes towards sexuality was limiting the ability of Americans to cope with their sexual problems. The Reisses' theory stated that American society would lower its rate of sexual problems if it increased its acceptance of an HER Sexual Pluralism ethic. In 1990 the Reisses predicted that the U.S. society would move further toward HER sexual pluralism and thus have higher condom usage, lower teen pregnancy rates, greater gender equality, and more acceptance of homosexuality—and all those trends have occurred. The Reisses published their research and theory in two editions in the 1990s.

=== Comparing the views of Reiss and Ellis ===
In the year 2000 Ira Reiss and Albert Ellis decided to publish a book with their personal letters to each other from the 1950s and 1960s regarding sexual attitudes and behaviors. Ellis was a famous psychologist and was one of the key founders of the therapeutic approach now called Cognitive Therapy. Ellis and Reiss were friends from the mid-1950s until Ellis's death in 2007. This book contained their letters plus comments from Reiss and Ellis concerning whether their views had changed over time. These letters were written at the time when the sexual revolution was beginning to take over America's sexual culture and Reiss and Ellis were two of the key people writing about sexuality at that time. Their book, published in 2002, displayed the differences and similarities in their professional assumptions and in their basic sexual values.

=== Summing up Reiss’s views of sexual science ===
In 2006 Reiss published a memoir in which he informally discussed the sexual science research and theory work that he had done over the years and integrated that with accounts of his interactions with other key sexologists in this field. This book presented Reiss's insider's view of sexual science and covered the sexual science field in the 50 years since the death of Kinsey in 1956. This book is a source for those interested in gaining an overall insight into Reiss's research and theory work as well as learning more about the many other sexologists who are key influences on sexual science today.

Latterly, Reiss stressed the need for our sexual science organizations to do more advocacy work, especially when the important research and theories produced are misrepresented or misused by politicians or others. In addition he has discussed various types of theoretical explanations that exist in sexual science and how researchers can, in part by increasing multidisciplinary theories, play a larger role in sexual problem solutions.
