= Samuel Johnson's literary criticism =

This article is an overview of Samuel Johnson's literary criticism.

== Poetry ==
Johnson's literature, especially his Lives of the Poets series, is marked by various opinions on what would make a poetic work excellent. He believed that the best poetry relied on contemporary language, and he disliked the use of decorative or purposefully archaic language. In particular, he was suspicious of John Milton's language, whose blank verse would mislead later poets, and could not stand the poetic language of Thomas Gray. On Gray, Johnson wrote, "Gray thought his language more poetical as it was more remote from common use".

Johnson would sometimes write parodies of poetry that he felt was poorly done; one such example is his translation of Euripides's play, Medea in a parody of one poet's style alongside his version of how the play should be translated. His greatest complaint was the overuse of obscure allusion found in works like Milton's Lycidas, and he preferred poetry that could be easily read. In addition to his views on language, Johnson believed that a good poem would incorporate new and unique imagery.

In his shorter works, Johnson preferred shorter lines and to fill his work with a feeling of empathy, which possibly influenced Alfred Edward Housman's poetry. In London, his first imitation of Juvenal, Johnson uses the form to express his political opinion. It is a poem of his youth and deals with the topic in a playful and almost joyous manner. As Donald Greene claims, "its charm comes from youthful exuberance and violence with which the witty invective comes tumbling out" in lines like:

Here malice, rapine, accident conspire,
And now a rabble rages, now a fire;
Their ambush here relentless ruffians lay,
And here the fell attorney prowls for prey;
Here falling houses thunder on your head,
And here a female atheist talks you dead.

His second imitation, The Vanity of Human Wishes, is completely different. The language remains simple, but the poem is more complicated and difficult to read because Johnson is trying to describe Christian ethics. These Christian values are not unique to the poem, but are part of Johnson's works as a whole. In particular, Johnson emphasises God's infinite love and that happiness can be attained through virtuous action.

== Biography ==
In terms of biography, Johnson did not agree with Plutarch's model of using biographies to teach morals and complement the subjects. Instead, Johnson believed in portraying the subjects accurately, including any negative aspects of an individual's life. Although revolutionary and more accurate as a biographer, Johnson had to struggle with his beliefs against a society that was unwilling to hear of details that may be viewed as tarnishing a reputation. In Rambler 60, Johnson put forth why he thought society could not be comfortable with hearing the negative truth of individuals that they admire:

All joy or sorrow for the happiness or calamities of others is produced by an act of imagination that realizes the event, however fictitious, or approximates it, however remote, by placing us, for a time, in the condition of him whose fortune we contemplate, so that we feel, while the deception lasts, whatever motions would be excited by the same good or evil happening to ourselves... Our passions are therefore more strongly moved, in proportion as we can more readily adopt the pains or pleasure proposed to our minds, by recognizing them as once our own.

Also, Johnson did not feel that biography should be limited to the most important people, but felt that the lives of lesser individuals could be deemed the most significant. In his Lives of the Poets, he chose great and lesser poets, and throughout all of his biographies, he always insisted on including what others may consider as trivial details to fully describe the lives of his subjects. When it came to autobiography, and diaries including his own, Johnson considered that genre of work as one having the most significance; he explains this in Idler 84, when he described how a writer of an autobiography would be the least likely to distort their own life.

== Lexicography ==
Johnson's thoughts on biography and on poetry found their union in his understanding of what would make a good critic. His works were dominated with his intent to use them for literary criticism, including his Dictionary to which he wrote: "I lately published a Dictionary like those compiled by the academies of Italy and France, for the use of such as aspire to exactness of criticism, or elegance of style". Although the smaller dictionary was written for the masses and became the common household dictionary, Johnson's original dictionary was an academic tool that examined how words were used, especially those uses that were found in literary works. To achieve this purpose, Johnson included quotations from Bacon, Hooker, Milton, Shakespeare, Spenser, and many others from the literary fields that Johnson thought were most important: natural science, philosophy, poetry, and theology. These quotes and usages were all compared and carefully studied, so that others could understand what words meant in literature.

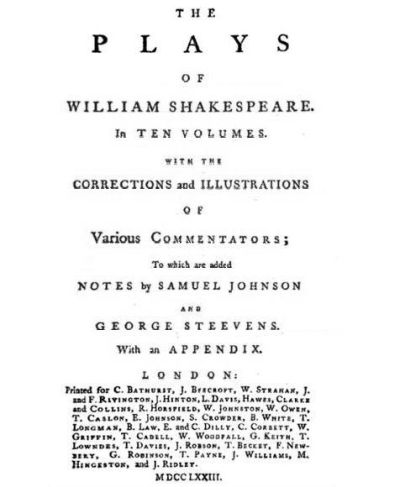
Plays of William Shakespeare, 1773 expanded edition, title page

Johnson felt that words, in and of themselves, were meaningless, but that meaning comes from context. The only way to understand the word is to examine its usage, and a critic must understand lexicography before they can understand what people are saying. Later critics would attempt to create theories to analyse the aesthetics of literature, but Johnson was not a theorist and he used his ideas only for the practical purpose to better read the works.

When it came to Shakespeare's plays, Johnson emphasised the role of a reader in understanding language when he wrote, "If Shakespeare has difficulties above other writers, it is to be imputed to the nature of his work, which required the use of common colloquial language, and consequently admitted many phrases allusive, elliptical, and proverbial, such as we speak and hear every hour without observing them".

== Shakespeare ==
His works on Shakespeare were not devoted just to Shakespeare, but to critical theory as a whole, and, in his Preface to Shakespeare, Johnson rejects the previous belief of the classical unities and establishes a more natural theory on what makes drama work: drama should be faithful to life. In particular, Johnson claimed that "Among [Shakespeare's] other excellences it ought to be remarked, because it has hitherto been unnoticed, that his heroes are men, that the love and hatred, the hopes and fears, of his chief personages are such as common to other human beings... Shakespeare's excellence is not the fiction of a tale, but the representation of life: and his reputation is therefore safe, till human nature shall be changed." Besides defending Shakespeare, Johnson was willing to discuss Shakespeare's faults, especially his lacking of morality, his vulgarity, and carelessness in crafting plots.

Besides direct literary criticism, Johnson emphasised the need to establish a text that accurately reflects what an author wrote. In his Preface, Johnson analysed the various versions of Shakespeare's plays and argued how an editor should work on them. Shakespeare's plays, in particular, had multiple editions that each contained errors from the printing process. This problem was compounded by careless editors deeming difficult words as incorrect and changing them in later editions. Johnson believed that an editor should not alter the text in such a way, and, when creating his own edition of Shakespeare's plays, he relied on the thousands of quotations and notes that he used in crafting his Dictionary to restore, to the best of his knowledge, the original text.

== See also ==
- Contextualism
