= Ethel Shanas =

Ethel Shanas (Chicago, September 6, 1914 – Evanston, Illinois, January 20, 2005) was an American scholar in the fields of Sociology of medicine and gerontology.

== Biography ==
Shanas graduated in 1949 at the University of Chicago with a dissertation on the social aspects of aging, under the mentorship of Ernest Burgess and Robert J. Havighurst. She worked at the University of Chicago until 1965, as a member of the university's Committee on Human Development, a lecturer in Sociology and a staff member of the National Opinion Research Center.

In 1957, Shanas directed the first national survey in the United States on the health needs of older people, which led to the publication in 1962 of her book The Health of Older People: A Social Survey. In 1962, she expanded her study with the help of colleagues in Denmark and the United Kingdom, comparing the situation of the elderly in these two countries and in the United States. The results were published in the collective book Old People in Three Industrial Societies (1968), and Shanas and her Danish colleagues later updated the research by repeating the surveys in their respective countries in 1975.

In 1965, she joined the faculty of University of Illinois at Chicago, where she continued teaching until 1982. In 1979, she was elected to the Institute of Medicine of the National Academy of Sciences. She also served as president of the Illinois Sociological Association, the Midwest Sociological Society and the Gerontological Society of America.

Shanas died on January 20, 2005.

== Views ==
Based on survey data, Shanas devoted her main works to criticize what she called the “social myths” about the elderly. First, while the general public in the surveys believed that old age and sickness were synonymous, most of the elderly did not consider themselves sick. Second, although later surveys will conclude that the situation had changed, Shanas’ studies in the 1950s and 1960s observed that most of the elderly in the United States were not isolated but were supported by their children, grandchildren, and neighbors, and regarded themselves as fully integrated in their communities.

Shanas’ further comparative research extended to Europe showed that in the United Kingdom and Denmark social welfare structures were as, or more, important than the families in supporting the elderly, but this did not prevent cases of poverty, lack of health care, and isolation.

Up to the end of her career, Shanas continued to believe that in Western advanced industrial societies the elderly have a better relation with their children than conventional wisdom would maintain, and that the family remains “the first resource for older persons in need of emotional and social support.”

== Selected bibliography by Shanas ==
- The Health of Older People: A Social Survey (1962). Cambridge, Mass.: Harvard University Press. ISBN 978-0674428232
- Old People in Three Industrial Societies (1968), with Peter Townsend, Dorothy Wedderburn, Henning Kristian Friis, Poul Milhoj, and Jan Stehouwer. New York: Atherton Press. ISBN 978-0710029621
