= William M. Yen =

Chinese-American physicist (1935–2008)

William M. Yen (April 5, 1935 – January 17, 2008) was a Chinese-American physicist.

Yen was born in Nanjing on April 5, 1935, and raised in Mexico City, where his father was posted as a diplomat for China's Nationalist government. The Yen family returned to China in 1948, then settled in Taiwan the following year, as part of the Kuomintang's Great Retreat. When Yen was sixteen, he moved to Redlands, California, to complete secondary education and subsequently earned a Bachelor of Science at the University of Redlands in 1956. He left California for Washington University in St. Louis, where he graduated with a PhD in 1962. Yen joined Arthur Schawlow at Stanford University to conduct postdoctoral research before moving to a faculty role at the University of Wisconsin–Madison in 1965. Yen became the inaugural Graham Perdue Chair of Physics at the University of Georgia in 1986.

Yen was elected a fellow of the American Physical Society and the Optical Society in 1977, and the American Association for the Advancement of Science in 1980.

Yen was married to Laurel and died on January 17, 2008, at the age of 72.
