= Poetic tradition =

Concept in historical literary criticism

Poetic tradition is a concept similar to that of the poetic or literary canon (a body of works of significant literary merit, instrumental in shaping Western culture and modes of thought). The concept of poetic tradition has been commonly used as a part of historical literary criticism, in which a poet or author is evaluated in the context of his historical period, his immediate literary influences or predecessors, and his literary contemporaries. T. S. Eliot claimed in Tradition and the Individual Talent, published in 1919, that for a poet to fully come into his own, he must be aware of his predecessors, and view the work of his predecessors as living, not dead. The poetic tradition is a line of descent of poets who have achieved a sublime state and can surrender themselves to their work to create a poem that both builds on existing tradition and stands on its own.

The necessity of a poet to be aware of his place in relation to his poem and to his tradition, to surrender himself to his work and to the great masters preceding him, is revisited by Harold Bloom in his 1973 work, The Anxiety of Influence. Bloom argued that each and every “great poet” must struggle with and overcome the anxiety of weakly imitating his predecessor poets. Bloom grounded his arguments on the work of Friedrich Nietzsche (notably Genealogy of Morals) and Sigmund Freud, though he disagrees with the tendency of both authors to “over-idealize the imagination.” To Bloom, a poetic tradition is a tradition of creative misreading, with each upcoming poet clearing a space in the poetic tradition for himself or herself by alleging some inconsistency, or mistake, or insufficient progress on the part of his or her predecessor(s). He cites multiple examples in this work and in his other work on the same topic, A Map of Misreading, published in 1975. One of these is the multiplicity of misreadings by poets and critics—including T. S. Eliot, Northrop Frye, and Percy Shelley—of Milton’s epic poems, Paradise Lost and Paradise Regained.

Poetic tradition remains a problematic concept, subject to the same flaws as the poetic canon. One such flaw is the issue of marginalized groups, or subsets of the population, including female writers and writers of a non-Anglo-Saxon ethnicity or tradition. Virginia Woolf addressed the question of a woman’s place in poetic tradition in A Room of One’s Own, asserting that, to produce artistic works, a woman (or indeed any poet) required personal space, financial support, and literary freedom. Woolf saw a place for women writers in the literary canon, but did not see a supporting system in place for women to use to get there. Notably, Bloom sees the development of a literary tradition as a primarily male-male struggle between father and son, referring several times to the myth of Oedipus. Literary tradition was also called into question for being almost exclusively Anglo-Saxon by Chinua Achebe, who criticized Joseph Conrad’s canonical novella, Heart of Darkness, for its racist images and attitudes in his 1975 essay, “An Image of Africa: Racism in Conrad’s Heart of Darkness.” Achebe advocated a less subjective study of literary tradition through the accommodation of critical and creative works representing opposing viewpoints. The idea of a poetic tradition is an inherently problematic one, for while it is not so difficult to agree on who should be included in the line of poets that constitute a poetic canon, it is extremely difficult to divine what relation they bear to each other, and how to read their works.

== Sources ==
- Achebe, Chinua. “An Image of Africa: Racism in Conrad’s Heart of Darkness.” The Norton Anthology of Theory and Criticism. Ed. Vincent B. Leitch. NY: W. W. Norton & Company, 2001.
- Bloom, Harold. A Map of Misreading. NY: Oxford University Press, 1975.
- Bloom, Harold. Poetry and Repression: Revisionism from Blake to Stevens. New Haven: Yale University Press, 1976.
- Bloom, Harold. The Anxiety of Influence. NY: Oxford University Press, 1973.
- Eliot, T. S. On Poetry and Poets. London: Faber and Faber, 1957.
- Eliot, T. S. The Sacred Wood: Essays on Poetry and Criticism. London: Methuen, 1950.
- Eliot, T. S. “Tradition and the individual talent.” The Norton Anthology of Theory and Criticism. Ed. Vincent B. Leitch. NY: W. W. Norton & Company, 2001.
- Freud, Sigmund. Beyond the Pleasure Principle. Trans. James Strachey. NY: W. W. Norton & Company, 1975.
- Nietzsche, Friedrich. On the Genealogy of Morals. Trans. Ian Johnston. 15 May 2006.
- Poetic tradition webpage
- Woolf, Virginia. A Room of One’s Own. NY: Harcourt, Brace & Company, 1929.
