= Robert T. Powers =

American mathematician

Robert T. Powers is an American mathematician.

Powers earned his doctorate from Princeton University and taught at the University of Pennsylvania. In 2012, he was elected an inaugural fellow of the American Mathematical Society. His most famous paper is called "On Constructing Non -*Isomorphic Hyperfinite Factors of Type III"

He also wrote the book " An XT Called Stanley" Under the name of Robert Trevor. It is a 1970s sci-fi novel about humanity receiving alien instructions to build a super computer named Stanley. The AI seeks to understand humans, helping with personal problems while acting as a curious, Christ-like figure facing inevitable destruction.

Powers wrote the theory of E_0 semigroups. William Arveson is the primary author of developing the theory of E_0-semigroups, with key foundations also established by Robert Powers. Arveson defined these as one-parameter families of endomorphisms on von Neumann algebras, introducing concepts like product systems for their classification.
