= Marjorie O'Rourke Boyle =

American academic (born 1943)

- Born: October 4, 1943 (age 83); Hackensack, New Jersey, U.S.
- Occupation: Religious studies scholar
- Awards: Guggenheim Fellowship (1979)

Academic background
- Education: Georgian Court College; University of St. Michael's College
- Thesis: The grammar of method: a theological study of Erasmus' renaissance, especially as manifested in his Ratio seu methodus compendio perveniendi ad veram theologiam (1974)

Academic work
- Discipline: Religious studies
- Sub-discipline: Religious rhetoric; Erasmus
- Institutions: University of Portland; Pontifical Institute of Mediaeval Studies

Marjorie O'Rourke Boyle (born October 4, 1943) is an American academic based in Canada. A 1979 Guggenheim Fellow, she specializes in religious rhetoric and has written several religious studies books.

== Biography ==
Marjorie O'Rourke Boyle was born on October 4, 1943, in Hackensack, New Jersey, to oil painter Marjorie J. O'Rourke (née McSorley) and to Paul O'Rourke, and raised in Middletown, Connecticut. She got her BA (1965) at Georgian Court College and her MA (1967) at the University of St. Michael's College. After working as a theology instructor at the University of Portland (1967-1969), she returned to St. Michael's to get her PhD in 1974; her doctoral dissertation was titled The grammar of method: a theological study of Erasmus' renaissance, especially as manifested in his Ratio seu methodus compendio perveniendi ad veram theologiam. She later worked as a research associate at the Pontifical Institute of Mediaeval Studies (1977-1978). By 1997, she was working as an independent scholar.

Boyle's academic specialty is religious rhetoric, particularly in the Middle Ages and Rennaissance. Three of the books she has written are focused on the Renaissance humanist scholar Erasmus: Erasmus on Language and Method in Theology (1977), Christening Pagan Mysteries (1981), and Rhetoric and Reform (1983). In 1979, she was awarded a Guggenheim Fellowship for a "study of the humanist nature of Erasmus's controversy with Luther". She later published the following books: Petrarch's Genius (1991), which its publisher said was the first book to depict Petrarch as a theologian; Divine Domesticity (1996), which focuses on the idea of the divine indwelling; Loyola's Acts (1997), which suggests that The Autobiography of St. Ignatius is epideictic; and Senses of Touch (1998), which explores the rhetorical nature of the human hand.

Outside of academia, Boyle worked briefly as a news editor for Toronto newspaper Daily Commercial News (1975-1976).

Boyle lives in Toronto.

== Bibliography ==
- Erasmus on Language and Method in Theology (1977)
- Christening Pagan Mysteries (1981)
- Rhetoric and Reform (1983)
- Petrarch's Genius (1991)
- Divine Domesticity (1996)
- Loyola's Acts (1997)
- Senses of Touch (1998)
