= Donald Greene =

Literary critic

Donald Johnson Greene (November 21, 1914 – May 13, 1997) was a literary critic, English professor, and scholar of British literature, particularly the eighteenth-century period. Known especially for his work on Samuel Johnson, he also wrote on later authors such as Jane Austen, Evelyn Waugh, Graham Greene, and Donald Davie.

== Early life ==
Greene was born in Moose Jaw, Saskatchewan, Canada. He began teaching in rural elementary schools and was a non-degreed teacher in Saskatchewan and Alberta. World War II interrupted his academic pursuits; from 1941 to 1945 Greene was a lieutenant and captain in the Royal Canadian Artillery. Following the war he received a graduate fellowship from the Imperial Order Daughters of the Empire, and he received his M.A. in 1948 at the University College, London. He twice received a Guggenheim Fellowship, in 1957 and 1979.

== Career ==
Greene had achieved a considerable scholarly contribution even before graduating, with commentary on Samuel Johnson appearing in Notes and Queries, PMLA, Modern Language Notes, and the Review of English Studies. Later, he was the editor of Eighteenth-Century Studies and a frequent contributor to the Johnsonian News Letter, along with holding the position as president of the Johnson Society and served on the board of directors for the Johnson Society of Southern California.

He taught at the University of Saskatchewan beginning in 1948 and in 1952 he began Ph.D. studies in Columbia University's English department, whose faculty included James L. Clifford — another Samuel Johnson specialist — and Marjorie Hope Nicolson. Greene taught at six other universities, including Brandeis University, the University of California at Riverside, the University of New Mexico, the University of Toronto, and the University of Wisconsin. He ended his career as Leo S. Bing Professor of English at the University of Southern California from 1968 to 1984.

== Selected works ==
- Johnsonian studies, 1887–1950: a survey and bibliography (with James Clifford). Minneapolis: University of Minnesota Press, 1951.
- The politics of Samuel Johnson. New Haven, Yale University Press, 1960.
- Samuel Johnson: A Collection of Critical Essays (Twentieth Century Views series). Englewood Cliffs, N.J.: Prentice-Hall, 1965.
- The age of exuberance; backgrounds to eighteenth-century English literature. New York: Random House, 1970.
- Samuel Johnson (Twayne's English Authors Series). New York: Twayne Publishers, 1970.
- Samuel Johnson; a survey and bibliography of critical studies (with James Clifford). Minneapolis: University of Minnesota Press, 1970.
- Samuel Johnson's library : an annotated guide. Victoria: University of Victoria, 1975.
- Political writings (Volume 10 of the Yale Complete Works of Samuel Johnson series). New Haven: Yale University Press, 1977.
- Samuel Johnson; a collection of critical essays. Charlottesville: University Press of Virginia, 1984.
- Greene centennial studies : essays presented to Donald Greene in the centennial year of the University of Southern California (with Paul Korshin and Robert Allen). Charlottesville : University Press of Virginia, 1984.
- Samuel Johnson (Oxford Authors). New York : Oxford University Press, 1984.
- A bibliography of Johnsonian studies, 1970–1985 (with John Vance). Victoria: University of Victoria, 1987.
- Samuel Johnson: Updated Edition (Twayne's English Authors Series). Boston: Twayne Publishers, 1989.
- Samuel Johnson: The major works (Oxford World Classics). Oxford, Oxford University Press, 2000.
