= Helen A. Moore =

Feminist sociologist

Helen Anne Moore is a feminist sociologist who studies educational inequality, especially in connection with Native American issues. She is Aaron Douglass Professor Emerita of Sociology and professor emeritus of Women's and Gender Studies at the University of Nebraska–Lincoln.

== Education and career ==
Moore was educated in sociology at the University of California, Riverside, earning a bachelor's degree in 1974, a master's degree in 1976, and a Ph.D. in 1979. She joined the University of Nebraska faculty in 1979, directed the Bureau of Sociological Research there from 1981 to 1983, directed the Women's Studies Program there from 1982 to 1987, chaired the Department of Sociology from 1992 to 1997, and was appointed as Douglass Professor in 2009.

She was president of the Midwest Sociological Society for 2007–2008, and editor of the journal Teaching Sociology from 1999 to 2004.

== Books ==
Moore is the author or editor of:

- Schooling Girls, Queuing Women: Multiple Standpoints and Ongoing Inequalities (Paradigm, 2011)
- A Sociology of Women: The Intersection of Patriarchy, Capitalism and Colonization (with Jane C. Ollenburger, Prentice-Hall, 1992; 2nd ed., 1998)
- A Feminist Ethic for Social Science Research (edited with B. Hartung, J. Ollenburger, and M. J. Deegan, as the Nebraska Sociological Feminist Collective, Edwin Mellen Press, 1988)

== Recognition ==
In 2016 the American Sociological Association gave Moore their Distinguished Contribution to Teaching Award.
