= Acutezza =

Acutezza (IPA: [akuˈtettsa]) is the act or use of wordplay. It is an Italian derived word. The direct translation from Italian to English is acuteness, shrewdness or shrillness.

== In rhetoric ==
Writers most commonly use wordplay to give the audience a sense of relevance to themselves and a sense of likability. Writers also use acutezza to mask an unpleasant-sounding phrase as a means of persuasion. At times, acutezza can seem clever or witty as if the writer is trying to "put one over" on the audience similar to an enthymeme, which can be the case. More often than not, the speaker is only trying to make their case sound better and as positive as possible. In addition to speech, acutezza can be seen visually as well. This is done through positioning words in a certain manner on the page to reflect the actual content of the sentence or phrase, yet, still giving it the illusion of positiveness.
