= Controlling Vice: Regulating Brothel Prostitution in St. Paul, 1865–1883 =

1998 book by Joel Best

- Author: Joel Best
- Publication date: 1998

Controlling Vice: Regulating Brothel Prostitution in St. Paul, 1865–1883 is a book by Minnesotan author Joel Best, published in 1998. It is the fourth book in the History of Crime and Criminal Justice Series, and documents the strategies that the Minnesota police officers enforced in attempts to regulate prostitution in the late nineteenth century.

== Summary ==
In the late 1800s, prostitution became a profession seen as an immoral act in the public eye to the point where the government felt the need to intervene to eradicate the issue. Joel Best explores the dispute over prostitution from the elements in which initiated the state's control to the action in which they took to regulate the problem. He first explores the two main motives that sparked a war over prostitution. The physicians who emphasized the threat to public health and the clergymen who deemed prostitution as an immoral and sinful act created these motives. The danger of contracting syphilis attracted the involvement of vice, as it was a sexually transmitted disease in which there was no known cure. Women were inspected for infection and if an infection was present, these women were immediately removed from the market. This was Minnesota's first line of defense in the prevention of spreading venereal diseases. Best then digs into the negative psychological connotation that society attached to the act of illicit sex. It was known as “the social evil” that would taint respectable citizens. In order to maintain order, police used their legal powers to seize and place potential disorderly subjects at fault in most deviant situations. The police felt that if they were able to control the brothels, that to some extent they would possess control over uncontrollable matters such as drunkenness.

Like the rest of the nation, prostitution was becoming an overpowering issue in Minnesota as well. In 1880, the capital of Minnesota, St. Paul, had seven brothels and 242 saloons, all of which were centered on the presence of prostitution. Order was becoming difficult to maintain, so the Minnesota police force took action in controlling the matter. As the numbers of officials were dwindling annually, making the act of maintaining peace a difficult one. Not only was the number of available patrols limited, but also police forces lacked the amenities needed to apprehend and lock up subjects. Squad cars and suitable jails were in short supply and the process of imprisoning delinquents was a hopeless duty. It was the St. Paul police's power to arrest those involved in prostitution that helped establish a policy of regulation. Arrests were becoming regular in the urban center of Minnesota as police officers were arresting around 14 madams each year. Police also allowed for the toleration of several regulated brothels, but they must be seen to by officials of the law with the ability to arrest by means to maintain order. But, many brothels avoided this regulation by masking themselves as “cigar stores” or “sewing girls” to keep the business of prostitution under the radar. Towards 1883, Minnesota was able to attain a grasp on prostitution as it was controlled through police regulation, which functioned to minimize disorder.

== Author ==
Joel Best was born and raised in the 1950s where he spent his childhood as a Minnesota resident, fascinated with the social problems that arose during this decade. His interest in sociology sparked his career as a professor of sociology and criminal justice at the University of Delaware. It was the deviant nature of prostitution that drove him to write this book and his partiality to Minnesota that propelled him to focus on the ramifications it had on Minnesota's society.

== Bibliography ==
- "About Joel." Joel Best. N.p., 2010. Web. 5 Dec. 2012.
- Atwell, Mary W. (April 1999). "Controlling Vice: Regulating Brothel Prostitution in St. Paul, 1865-1883., 1865-1883 by Joel Best". The Law and Politics Book Review. 9 (4): 138–140.
- Valverde, Mariana (2000). "Reviewed Work: Controlling Vice: Regulating Brothel Prostitution in St. Paul, 1865-1883. by Joel Best". The Journal of American History. 86 (4): 1802–1803. doi:10.2307/2567657. hdl:1811/29306. JSTOR 2567657.
- "Controlling Vice: Regulating Brothel Prostitution in St. Paul, 1865-1883." EH.net. Economic History Association, 25 July 2001. Web. 5 Dec. 2012.
- "Prostitution and Sex Trafficking in Minnesota's Urban Communities Topic of UROC Critical Conversations Oct. 18." UMNews. University of Minnesota, 11 Oct. 2011. Web. 09 Dec. 2012.
