= Roberta G. Simmons =

American sociologist (1937–1993)

- Born: Roberta Grodberg; November 30, 1937; Boston, Massachusetts, U.S.
- Died: February 15, 1993 (aged 55); Pittsburgh, Pennsylvania, U.S.
- Spouse: Richard L. Simmons (m. 1958)
- Children: 2
- Awards: Guggenheim Fellowship (1979)

Academic background
- Education: Wellesley College; Columbia University
- Thesis: An experimental study of the role-conflict of the first-line supervisor (1964)

Academic work
- Discipline: Sociology
- Sub-discipline: Sociology of organ transplants
- Institutions: Barnard College; National Institute of Mental Health; University of Minnesota; University of Pittsburgh

Roberta Grodberg Simmons (November 30, 1937 – February 15, 1993) was an American sociologist. A 1979 Guggenheim Fellow, she studied the psychology of adolescence and later organ transplants and authored the books Black and White Self-Esteem (1972), Gift of Life (1977), and Moving Into Adolescence (1987). She was a professor at the University of Minnesota and University of Pittsburgh, and she served as president of the Midwest Sociological Society.

== Biography ==
Simmons was born on November 30, 1937, in Boston, daughter of Burton C. Grodberg. She attended Wellesley College, where she obtained a BA in 1959, and Columbia University, where she obtained an MA in 1961 and a PhD in 1964. Her doctoral dissertation was titled An experimental study of the role-conflict of the first-line supervisor.

After working as a lecturer at Barnard College, she was assistant professor at Columbia in 1966, before working as a staff fellow at the National Institute of Mental Health's Laboratory of Socio-Environmental Studies from 1966 to 1968. She joined the University of Minnesota as an assistant professor in 1969, before being promoted to associate professor in 1972 and full professor in 1976. She later moved to the University of Pittsburgh in 1987, retaining her professor title.

Simmons studied the psychology of adolescence and later organ transplants, with one of her findings concluding that an organ transplant "was considered a priceless gift by some recipients and a burdensome debt by others". She was author of three books: Black and White Self-Esteem (1972), Gift of Life (1977), and Moving Into Adolescence (1987). Dale A. Blyth said that "her work on biomedical altruism and organ donation is highly regarded", and United Network for Organ Sharing executive Lin McGaw called Simmons "really way ahead of her time" due to her work in the field.

In 1979, she was awarded a Guggenheim Fellowship for "a comparative study of the policy and ethical issues of organ transplantation". She won the NIMH Research Scientist Career Development Award fifteen times and was a 1986-1987 Center for Advanced Study in the Behavioral Sciences Fellow.

She was president of the Midwest Sociological Society, vice-president of the Eastern Sociological Society, and chair of the medical sociology section of the ASA, as well as a council member at the Society for Research on Adolescence (1986-1990) and the ASA.

On September 7, 1958, she married Richard L. Simmons, who later co-authored her first book. They had two children.

Simmons died on February 15, 1993, in UPMC Presbyterian Hospital in her native Pittsburgh, after fifteen years with breast cancer. She was 55 and predeceased both her father and husband.

== Bibliography ==
- Black and White Self-Esteem (1972; with Morris Rosenberg) (Note: Reviews of this book:)
- Gift of Life (1977; with Susan D. Klein and Richard L. Simmons) (Note: Reviews of this book:)
- Moving Into Adolescence (1987; with Dale A. Blyth) (Note: Reviews of this book:)
