= Warren P. Porter =

Biophysical ecologist, environmental toxicologist

- Occupations: Biophysical ecologist, environmental toxicologist and academic

Academic background
- Education: University of Wisconsin–Madison; University of California, Los Angeles

Academic work
- Institutions: University of Wisconsin-Madison

Warren P. Porter is an American biophysical ecologist, environmental toxicologist, and an academic. He is an emeritus Professor in the Department of Integrative Biology at the University of Wisconsin–Madison.

Porter's research focuses on bioinformatics, conservation biology, ecology, animals on landscapes, environmental toxicology, and evolution. He founded and co-founded two companies, Isomark and Niche-Mapper, which develop technology to predict animal health, energetics and behavior.

== Education ==
Porter earned a bachelor's degree in Zoology from the University of Wisconsin–Madison in 1961. He went on to receive a master's degree in Ichthyology in 1963 and later a Ph.D. in Physiological Ecology with Ken Norris in 1966, both from the University of California, Los Angeles. Subsequently, in 1966, he received postdoctoral training in Biophysical Ecology with David Gates at the Missouri Botanical Garden and Washington University in St. Louis.

== Career ==
Porter began his academic career as an assistant professor of zoology at the University of Wisconsin in 1968, where he was later appointed associate professor in 1971, and Professor in 1974. He has been serving as an emeritus Professor of Integrative Biology at the University of Wisconsin since 2018.

Porter was Chair of the Department of Zoology at the University of Wisconsin from 1993 to 1998. In 1998, he joined The National Center for Ecological Analysis and Synthesis as a Senior Fellow at the University of California, Santa Barbara and remained there on sabbatical for a year. He has been a member of the University of Wisconsin Center for Integrated Agriculture Systems Advisory Board since 1998. He has been a member of the Board of Directors of Beyond Pesticides since 1998.

== Research ==
Porter has contributed to the field of ecology by studying biophysical ecology, environmental toxicology, modeling animal landscapes, mechanistic ecology, and the effects of climate change on animal survival and reproduction potential. He is known for his investigations into the understanding of physiological limits and climate effects on animal range limits and distributions and also holds patents for his discoveries. He holds 10 patents.

=== Biophysical ecology and modeling ===
Porter has studied biophysical ecology throughout his career, in collaboration with David Gates. He demonstrated how biophysical ecology principles can assess habitat quality from a physiological perspective, with examples from representative vertebrate and invertebrate groups illustrating the utility of modeling animal landscapes to evaluate climate and land-use change effects. Additionally, he integrated principles from engineering, meteorology, and soil physics with ecology and physiology to develop a model for predicting animal behavior based on energy balance in the Mojave Desert, showcasing close agreement between predicted and measured temperatures.

Porter in collaboration with John Mitchell created and patented an analytical tool called Niche Mapper, which computes the range of local available microclimates and their impacts on animal energetics, behavior, and distribution boundaries on a landscape scale, and integrates these behavior and distribution models with the effects of climate and disease on the landscape. In collaboration with Michael Kearney, Niche Mapper software was converted to a version in R, NicheMapR. He also demonstrated with Megan Fitzpatrick that the mechanistic model, Niche Mapper, accurately simulated the heat exchanges of wading animals, specifically Whooping Cranes, validating its effectiveness in estimating energy expenditure. In collaboration with Peter Dudley, he combined 3D animation software with computational fluid dynamics to develop a computational platform for studying the impact of morphological variations on marine organisms, with a focus on leatherback sea turtles, predicting their distribution over time in response to both climate change and evolutionary shifts in shell structure.

=== Environmental toxicology ===
Porter has researched environmental toxicology, particularly examining the impact of subtle environmental contaminants on neurological, endocrine, immune, and developmental functions. He developed a stable isotope technique for the early non-invasive detection of diseases and infections by analyzing naturally occurring stable isotopes in breath in collaboration with Fariba Assadi-Porter and Mark Cook. Moreover, his research work looked into the effects of low-level pesticide mixtures in food and water, revealing changes in learning, aggression, immune function, hormone levels, and developmental anomalies in animals exposed to such mixtures.

=== Climate change effects ===
Porter explored the effects of climate change on wild and domestic animals. In a collaborative study, he utilized Niche Mapper to accurately model the movements, habitat preferences, and physiology of Western toads in forested habitats, shedding light on the potential physiological costs associated with climate warming in various landscapes. In collaboration with Michael Kearney, he used biophysical models to predict the impact of climate change on the dengue fever bearing mosquito, Aedes aegypti in Australia, highlighting the significance of water availability, egg desiccation resistance, and cold tolerance, with potential indirect effects of altered water storage practices possibly overshadowing direct climate impacts.

Porter in collaboration with Paul Mathewson incorporated a mechanistic model into species distribution models for the American pika revealing the potential for behavioral thermoregulation to mitigate habitat loss under future climate change. He further contributed to the study showing that the St. Paul Island's woolly mammoth population was vulnerable to resource limitations, primarily due to vegetation productivity, island size, and freshwater availability.

== Awards and honors ==
- 1979 – Fellowship Award, John Simon Guggenheim Memorial Foundation
- 1984 – Elected Fellow, American Association of for the Advancement of Science
- 2004 – Leadership Award, Beyond Pesticides
- 2014 – Innovation Award, State of Wisconsin
- 2016 – Organic Pioneer Researcher Award, Rodale Institute

== Selected articles ==
- Porter, W. P., & Gates, D. M. (1969). Thermodynamic equilibria of animals with environment. Ecological monographs, 39(3), 227–244.
- Porter, W. P., Mitchell, J. W., Beckman, W. A., & DeWitt, C. B. (1973). Behavioral implications of mechanistic ecology: thermal and behavioral modeling of desert ectotherms and their microenvironment. Oecologia, 13, 1-54.
- Jaeger, J. W., Carlson, I. H., & Porter, W. P. (1999). Endocrine, immune, and behavioral effects of aldicarb (carbamate), atrazine (triazine) and nitrate (fertilizer) mixtures at groundwater concentrations. Toxicology and Industrial health, 15(1-2), 133–151.
- Kearney, M., & Porter, W. P. (2004). Mapping the fundamental niche: physiology, climate, and the distribution of a nocturnal lizard. Ecology, 85(11), 3119–3131.
- Kearney, M., & Porter, W. (2009). Mechanistic niche modelling: combining physiological and spatial data to predict species' ranges. Ecology letters, 12(4), 334–350.
- Kearney, M., Shine, R., & Porter, W. P. (2009). The potential for behavioral thermoregulation to buffer "cold-blooded" animals against climate warming. Proceedings of the National Academy of Sciences, 106(10), 3835–3840.
- Dudley, P. N., Bonazza, R., Jones, T. T., Wyneken, J., & Porter, W. P. (2014). Leatherbacks swimming in silico: modeling and verifying their momentum and heat balance using computational fluid dynamics. PLoS One, 9(10), e110701.
- Mathewson, P. D., Darnell, M. Z., Lane, Z. M., Yeghissian, T. G., Levinton, J., & Porter, W. P. (2023). Incorporating species-specific morphology improves model predictions of thermal and hydric stress in the sand fiddler crab, Leptuca pugilator. Journal of Thermal Biology, 103613.
- Porter, W. P., Bertz, A. E., Mathewson, P. D., Solorzano, L. C., Dudley, P. N., Bonazza, R., & Gebremedhin, K. G. (2023). Climate Spaces and Cliffs: A Novel Bovine Thermodynamic and Mass Balances Model. Animals, 13(19), 3043.
- Verzuh, T. L., Rogers, S. A., Mathewson, P. D., May, A., Porter, W. P., Class, C., ... & Monteith, K. L. (2023). Behavioural responses of a large, heat‐sensitive mammal to climatic variation at multiple spatial scales. Journal of Animal Ecology, 92(3), 619–634.
