= Nancy Hartsock =

American social sciences scholar (1943–2015)

- Born: 1943
- Died: March 19, 2015 (aged 72); Seattle

Philosophical work
- Institutions: University of Washington
- Main interests: Feminist epistemology and standpoint theory
- Notable works: The Feminist Standpoint (essay)

Nancy C. M. Hartsock (1943–2015) was a professor of Political Science and Women Studies (now Gender, Women, and Sexuality Studies) at the University of Washington from 1984 to 2009.

== Personal life and education ==
Hartsock was born in 1943 in a Methodist lower-middle class family, in Ogden, Utah. She attended Wellesley College. While there, Hartsock was involved in the Wellesley Civil Rights Group. This group provided tutoring in Roxbury and Boston, Massachusetts, as well as working with the Boston NAACP.

After finishing college, Hartsock went to get her master's degree from the University of Chicago. There, she got involved with a community organization group called The Woodlawn Organization, which was started by activist Saul Alinsky.

When Martin Luther King brought the Civil Rights movements north, Hartsock marched to help this movement. After this march, she then helped start a graduate student woman's caucus in Political Science.

Hartsock received her Ph.D. in Political Science from the University of Chicago in 1972. She was a practiced musician—prior to her dissertation, Hartsock built and played the harpsichord. Hartsock also expressed interest in equestrianism, food, travel and art.

== Career ==
Hartsock was a feminist philosopher. She was known for her work in feminist epistemology and standpoint theory, especially the 1983 essay "The Feminist Standpoint", (Note: Hartsock, Nancy (2004), "The feminist standpoint: developing the ground for a specifically feminist historical materialism", in Harding, Sandra (ed.), The feminist standpoint theory reader: intellectual and political controversies, New York: Routledge, pp. 35–54, ISBN 9780415945011. Available online.) which also integrated Melanie Klein's theories on psychoanalysis and the Oedipal crisis. Her standpoint theory derived from Marxism, which claims that the proletariat has a distinctive perspective on social relations and that only this perspective reveals the truth. She drew an analogy between the industrial labor of the proletariat and the domestic labor of women to show that women can also have a distinctive standpoint.

The Feminist Standpoint Revisited and Other Essays was then published in 1998.

Hartsock taught in the Political Science Department of the University of Michigan. After a 3 year period, she moved to Washington, D.C., and took a course at Institute for Policy Studies (IPS) on feminist theory in 1973. She then took part in the Quest staff and was in the subscription department where she did writing and editing. Quest lasted for almost 10 years.

Once she left Quest, she taught Political Science at Johns Hopkins. There she also helped take part in the effort to bring Woman's Studies to the University. Several years after, she moved to the University of Washington and learned that the Woman's Studies at Johns Hopkins was now a course.

Later, she focused her attention on woman's labor. Specifically, in the political economic dynamics of globalization. Hartsock then retired in 2009.

She served as President of the Western Political Science Association (1994–95), and was the Co-founder of the Center for Women & Democracy in Seattle, WA, Founding Director (1999-2000).

== Death and legacy ==
In 1985, Hartsock was diagnosed with late-stage breast cancer and lived for 30 more years. Hartsock died on March 19, 2015, in Seattle, Washington.

Prior to her retirement in 2009 Hartsock established the Nancy C.M. Hartsock Prize for Best Graduate Paper in Feminist Theory. Students from any college and from any department may apply.

== Awards ==
- Mentor of Distinction Award from the American Political Science Association Women's Caucus (1993, won)

== Selected bibliography ==
=== Books ===
- Hartsock, Nancy (1983). Money, sex, and power: toward a feminist historical materialism. New York: Longman. ISBN 9780582282803.
- Hartsock, Nancy (1998). The feminist standpoint revisited and other essays. Boulder, Colorado: Westview Press. ISBN 9780813315584.

=== Chapters in books ===
- Hartsock, Nancy (February 28, 1983), Discovering Reality. "The feminist standpoint: developing the ground for a specifically feminist historical materialism", in Harding, Sandra.pp. 283–310 (Note: Hartsock, Nancy C. M. (1983). "The Feminist Standpoint: Developing the Ground for a Specifically Feminist Historical Materialism". In Harding, Sandra; Hintikka, Merrill B. (eds.). Discovering Reality. Synthese Library. Vol. 161. Springer Netherlands. pp. 283–310. doi:10.1007/0-306-48017-4_15. ISBN 978-0-306-48017-1. S2CID 146393875.)
- Hartsock, Nancy (1997), "The feminist standpoint: developing the ground for a specifically feminist historical materialism", in Nicholson, Linda (ed.), The second wave: a reader in feminist theory, New York: Routledge, pp. 216–240, ISBN 9780415917612.
- Hartsock, Nancy (2004), "The feminist standpoint: developing the ground for a specifically feminist historical materialism", in Harding, Sandra; Hintikka, Merrill B. (eds.), The feminist standpoint theory reader: intellectual and political controversies, New York: Routledge, pp. 35–54, ISBN 9780415945011. Available online.
- Sisterhood is Powerful. Short entry explaining the remarks that professors made about the Woman's Caucus in 1970

=== Journal articles ===
- Hartsock, Nancy (Summer 1974). "Political change: two perspectives on power". Quest. 1 (1). Diana Press: 10–25.

Also available as:Hartsock, Nancy (1981), "Political change: two perspectives on power", in Bunch, Charlotte (ed.), Building feminist theory: essays from "Quest", New York, New York: Longman, pp. 3–19, ISBN 9780582282100.

- Hartsock, Nancy (Winter 1989–1990). "Postmodernism and political change: issues for feminist theory". Cultural Critique. 14 (14): 15–33. doi:10.2307/1354291. JSTOR 1354291. S2CID 147557826.

Also available as:Hartsock, Nancy (1989), "Postmodernism and political change: issues for feminist theory", in Hartsock, Nancy; Przybylowicz, Donna; McCallum, Pamela (eds.), Cultural Critique, Cary, North Carolina: Oxford University Press, OCLC 60609387.

- Hartsock, Nancy (Winter 1997). "Comment on Hekman's "Truth and Method: Feminist Standpoint Theory Revisited": truth or justice?". Signs: Journal of Women in Culture and Society. 22 (2): 367–374. doi:10.1086/495161. JSTOR 3175277. S2CID 143503819.

See also: Hekman, Susan (Winter 1997). "Truth and method: feminist standpoint theory revisited". Signs: Journal of Women in Culture and Society. 22 (2): 341–365. doi:10.1086/495159. JSTOR 3175275. S2CID 13884397.
