= Feminist epistemology =

Examination of the study of knowledge from a feminist standpoint

Feminist epistemology is an examination of epistemology from a feminist standpoint.

== Overview ==
Feminist epistemology claims that ethical and political values are important in shaping epistemic practices, and interpretations of evidence. Feminist epistemology has been in existence for over 40 years. Feminist epistemology studies how gender influences our understanding of knowledge, justification and theory of knowledge; it describes how knowledge and justification disadvantage women. Feminist epistemology is derived from the terms feminism and epistemology. Feminism is concerned with the abolition of gender and sex inequalities rooted in discrimination, while epistemology is the inquiry into knowledge's meaning. Scholars of feminist epistemology claim that some theories of knowledge discriminate against women by disbarring them from inquiry, unfairly criticizing their cognitive styles, and producing theories of women and social phenomena that reinforce gender hierarchies and represent women as inferior. The easy and uncontroversial point is that much of what has been recognised as knowledge and passed on in academic and industrial circles has been produced by men. Consequently their experiences and concerns have served to determine its direction. According to feminist epistemologists, these failures in dominant knowledge result from faulty scientific methodologies and knowledge conceptions. Therefore, feminist epistemologists attempt to propagate theories that aid liberation and egalitarian causes and protect these endeavors as advances in knowledge.

The central idea of feminist epistemology is that knowledge reflects the particular perspectives of the theory. The main interest of feminist philosophers is how gender stereotypes situate knowing subjects. They approach this interest from three different perspectives: feminist standpoint theory, feminist postmodernism, and feminist empiricism. Standpoint theory defines a specific social perspective as epistemically privileged. Feminist postmodernism emphasizes the instability of the social identity explorers and therefore their representations. Empiricism focuses on combining the main ideas of feminism and their observations to prove feministic theories through evidence.

Elizabeth Anderson argues that the concept of situated knowledge is central to feminist epistemology. Donna Haraway asserts that most knowledge (in particular academic knowledge) is always situated and "produced by positioned actors working in/between all kinds of locations, working up/on/through all kinds of research relation(ships)", and thus what is known and the ways in which this knowledge can be known is subject to the position—the situation and perspective—of the knower.

The English feminist philosopher Miranda Fricker has argued that in addition to social or political injustices, there can be epistemic injustices in two forms: testimonial injustice and hermeneutical injustice. Testimonial injustice consists in prejudices that cause one to "give a deflated level of credibility to a speaker's word": Fricker gives the example of a woman who due to her gender is not believed in a business meeting. She may make a good case, but prejudice causes the listeners to believe her arguments to be less competent or sincere and thus less believable. In this kind of case, Fricker argues that as well as there being an injustice caused by possible outcomes (such as the speaker missing a promotion at work), there is a testimonial injustice: "a kind of injustice in which someone is wronged specifically in her capacity as a knower". Such an awareness allows a hearer to account for the likely impact of the identity power relation that mediates between himself and the speaker on his spontaneous perception, essentially correcting for the problems that can result in transactions of testimonial injustice.

In the case of hermeneutical injustice, "speakers' knowledge claims fall into lacunae in the available conceptual resources, thus blocking their capacity to interpret, and thence to understand or claim a hearing for their experiences." For example, when the language of 'sexual harassment' or 'homophobia' were not generally available, those who experienced these wrongs lacked the resources to make a claim to being wronged in morally relevant ways.

The philosopher Susan Haack is a notable critic of feminist epistemology.

Sandra Harding organized feminist epistemology into three categories: feminist empiricism, standpoint epistemology, and post-modern epistemology. While potentially a limited set of categories, post-modern feminism was a transitional ideology that denounced absolute objectivity and asserted the death of the meta-narrative. While these three categories of feminist epistemology have their place in history (see feminist empiricism, standpoint feminism, postmodern feminism), as ideological frameworks they hold epistemic insights in contemporary feminist method. Feminist theorist Nina Lykke, has expanded upon these three categories to include "postmodern feminist (anti-)epistemology...[and]...postconstructionist feminist epistemology"

== Feminist empiricism ==
Feminist empiricism emerged from a feminist critique that gave attention to male bias in positivistic practices of science. 2nd Wave feminist researchers identified how quantification and objectivity, as facets of positivism, have been held as the "gold standard" for social and political science research. Quantification, and its political relationships to notions of objectivity, maintains methodological dominance and preference primarily in the United States. This is perpetuated by how funding authorities tend to prioritize quantitative research with positivist frameworks.

Feminist empiricists believe in the concept of positivism; that all knowledge can be understood objectively and can be accessed through empirical research. They assert that pre-feminist positivism was actually not objective at all, since traditional positivism's 'androcentric bias' led to only partial or 'subjective' knowledge of the world. In essence, all empirical inquiry is inherently skewed by value judgments and biased interpretation of evidence by male-biased authorities. For instance, it was not until retrieving statistical data on the prevalence of women in the workplace experiencing (what is now known to be) 'sexual harassment' through surveys in the 1970s that sexual harassment became identified by political authorities as a commonality. Without this intervention of feminists in an empirical field, this commonality would never have been identified as an issue, since males had no reason to pursue this phenomenon. Londa Schiebinger further asserts that empirical research "embodies many core feminist values", in that feminist empiricists are actively seeking out and eliminating exploitative research whilst resisting strategic, oppressive explanations of data.

Feminist empiricism is critiqued for its belief that "objectivity" is best achieved through quantification, whether or not viewed through a feminist lens or utilized for feminist ideals. The division between quantitative and qualitative data has historically reinforced gendered dichotomies of "hard/soft, emotional/rational, worthy/worthless". Many assert that 'objective truth' is a false concept, and thus feminist empiricists may overestimate the extent to which they can increase objectivity. Furthermore, positivism and quantitative research has been critiqued as a "detached" philosophical framework that inherently objectifies its research subjects.

Feminist empiricists respond to the problem of value-neutrality by lengthening Quine's argument: theory is not determined by evidence. Any observation counts as proof for particular thesis only if connected with certain background presumptions, because similar observation might support different hypotheses. In daily life, scientists face some restrictions in selecting the background assumptions, that are based on cognitive values like simplicity and conservatism, which a political and social philosophy that is based on retaining traditional social establishments. Feminist empiricists state that no logical or methodological principle categorically prohibits scientists from choosing their background assumptions as their political and social values or other interests. Therefore, feminist scientists may select their background presumptions on account of their opinions on some feminist values.

=== Two paradoxes ===
There are two central paradoxes with feminist empiricism—the paradox of bias and the paradox of social construction.

==== Paradox of bias ====
Many feminist empiricists advocate for exposing the androcentric and sexist biases in scientific research, namely that people have a bias towards gender difference and sexuality. However, while feminist empiricists would claim that the feminist inquiry helps the development of science, their own perspective adopts certain biases about gender and science.

The paradox of bias emerges from arguments that revise or reject conceptions of impartiality and objectivity in research. This bias lies between feminist empiricism's two main commitments. First, feminist empiricism is committed to the feminist project. In other words, feminists are determined to expose, subvert and overcome all forms of oppression. In the context of feminist epistemology, the consequence of this outcome is that feminists constantly attack impartiality as a disguise of the subjective interests of the powerful in society. The second commitment is to empiricism, where feminists pledge allegiance to the methods and tools of analytical philosophy. While analytic philosophy(?) (feminism?) requires a commitment to subjectivity, empiricism requires partakers to endorse impartiality. Therefore, there is a paradox of bias that confronts both empiricism and epistemological views that attempt to balance subjectivism and objectivism in knowledge acquisition.

Simply stated, the paradox of bias is the existing tension between feminists who criticize male bias for lacking impartiality and feminists who reject the impartiality ideal. The latter claim that objectivity and neutrality are unattainable, which becomes problematic when claiming the objectivity of their viewpoints. According to Andrew, all epistemological views are biased. Besides, it is difficult to distinguish between various subjective principles without biased or partial evaluation standards. Therefore, it becomes difficult to conceptualize and evaluate bias while rejecting impartiality. Anthony makes several claims in formulating the paradox of bias. First, he asserts that impartiality is not a tenable epistemic practice ideal. Secondly, he states that the untenable state of impartiality means that all epistemic practices have an inherent bias. Thirdly, it is impossible to develop impartial criteria for assessing the epistemic value of biases if all practices are biased. Lastly, all biases are equal since there are no unbiased criteria for evaluating practices. These claims suggest that people should either endorse objectivity or stop distinguishing between good and biases.

==== Paradox of social construction ====
Many critics of feminist science argue that science is generally influenced by political and social factors. These critics advance sexist and androcentric theories due to the influence of sexist values in society. This implies the existence of social biases in feminist science, which may be eliminated through the adoption of individual epistemology. Nonetheless, many feminists believe in the openness of scientific practices to diverse social influences, resulting in the paradox of social construction.

=== Criticism of empiricism theory ===
It is the most criticized theory by others, for its assumptions that transhistorical subject of knowledge exists outside of social determination (Harding 1990). Also feminist empiricism theory states that science will correct all the biases and errors in theories about women and other groups by itself. According to Harding, this criticism stems from the perception that it is sufficient to eliminate sexist bias without altering traditional scientific methods further. Feminist empiricism has also been criticized for ignoring the role of feminist political activity as a vital source of evidence and hypotheses to challenge androcentric and sexist theories. This criticism applies especially to the development of oppositional consciousness as an element of feminist political activity.

== Standpoint epistemology ==
At a basic level, standpoint epistemology asserts that marginalized groups such as women are bestowed with an "epistemic privilege", where there exists the potential for less distorted understandings of the world than dominant groups, such as men. This methodology presents many new ideas to the feminist empiricist notion that androcentric dominance and bias presents an incomplete understanding of the world. A "standpoint" is not so much about a subject's biased perspective, but instead the 'realities' that structure social relationships of power.

Standpoint theories portray the universe from a concrete situated perspective. Every standpoint theory must specify: the social location from the feminist perspective, the scope of its privileges, the social role and the identity that generates knowledge and the justification of these privileges. Feminist standpoint theory states a privilege in gender relations, various feminist standpoint theories are based on the statement about the epistemic privilege in different feministic situations. Feminist standpoint theory is one of the types of critical theory, their main intention is to improve their situation. In order to achieve this critical aim, social theories must represent the understanding of feministic problems and try to improve their condition. Critical theory is theory of, by, and for the subjects of study. Feminism and feminist epistemology is all about inquiry, assumptions, and theories. Through these methods feminist epistemology overcomes the tension between bias on which feminist empiricism is based on. It presents an elaborate map or method for maximizing "strong objectivity" in natural and social science, yet does not necessarily focus on encouraging positivistic scientific practices, like is central to Feminist Empiricism.

Although standpoint epistemology has been critiqued for focusing too closely on a distinctive women's perspective which may render invisible concepts of historically and sociologically variable knowledge, Harding strongly asserts that standpoint epistemology does not essentialize any particular marginalized identity. Harding further argues that the methodology does not subscribe to notions of "maximizing neutrality" between groups in an effort to maximize objectivity, but instead recognizes that the power relations between groups are what complicate these relationships. This is in some ways contrary to Doucet's assertion that the controversy of how power influenced knowledge production is a post-standpoint, more contemporary debate. Standpoint epistemology also poses a necessity to ask critical questions about the lives and social institutions created by dominant groups; where the field becomes a sociology for women and not solely about women.

In practicality, standpoint theory has widespread use as "a philosophy of knowledge, a philosophy of science, a sociology of knowledge, a moral/political advocacy of the expansion of democratic rights". Although it has been asserted that "epistemic privilege" is inherent to marginalized groups, Harding poses standpoint theory as an explanatory means for both marginalized and dominant group individuals to be able to achieve liberatory perspectives. In building her standpoint epistemology, Sandra Harding used and built on her interpretation of the work of philosophers of science Thomas Kuhn and Willard Quine. Harding's standpoint theory is also grounded in Marxism, although she largely rejected classical Marxism for its portrayal of women in merely class terms.

In The Structure of Scientific Revolutions, Kuhn argued that scientific progress does not occur through gradual accumulation of correct ideas. Rather, he believed that there were occasionally large revolutions that completely overturned the previous scientific theories. When a crisis occurs within the prevailing theory of a time, revolutionary scientists will challenge them and build new scientific theories. For example, in his view, the transition from the geocentrism of Ptolemy to the heliocentric theory of Copernicus did not occur through a gradual series of challenges and improvements to the previous model. Rather, it was a sudden and complete revolution because it is impossible to conceptualize the theory of heliocentrism within the dominant geocentric theory. Kuhn argued that together, the ideas of Newton, Galileo, and Kepler completed the revolution that Copernicus started. However, most students of science do not learn of the many failed and alternative scientific paradigms. They are taught a version of the history of science where progress is guaranteed and linear. In Harding's view, Kuhn's theories showed that all science was situated within its historical context, and that any theory could remain accepted if its believers held power.

Criticism of standpoint theory: Philosopher Helen Longino is against standpoint theory, because she claims that standpoint theory can not provide the knowledge of which standpoints have the most privilege. Bar On (1993) said that if feminine ethics of care provides privileged perspective on morality, then our moral knowledge is convinced only by existence of gender relations. Bar On also claims that theory which explains structural relationship between advanced and less developed, which dictates epistemic privilege can not be applied to women. Marx claimed that class conflict derives other conflicts such as racism, sexism, national and religious conflicts.

Feminist epistemology is criticized by different philosophers. Feminist postmodernists blame feminist empiricists for assuming the existence of an individual and for admitting an uncritical concept of experience. Naturalized Quine epistemology of some feminist empiricists perceives knowers as socially situated; Hundleby, a standpoint theorist, criticizes feminist empiricism for disregarding the key role of women in political activities.

Standpoint theory is often criticized for the lack of evidence available to support it and the ideas underlying it, such as the lack of justification for the underdetermination theory Harding uses. Pinnick, to illustrate her point about Harding's poor evidence, points to standpoint theory's claim that science is more objective if it is politically motivated, which Pinnick claims runs contrary to what has happened in the past when scientists deliberately injected politics into their theories (she cites eugenics and intelligence test designs as examples of politicized science). She also criticizes Harding for claiming that marginalized groups produce better, less biased scientific results because, according to Pinnick, Harding fails to provide any empirical evidence for this idea.

== Postmodernism ==
Postmodernism is inspired by postmodernist and postculturalist theorists such as Lyotard and Foucalt, who question universality and objectivity as ways to transcend situatedness. In other words, postmodernism focuses partiality, locality and contestability of worldviews. By delegitimizing dominant ideas, postmodernism allows for imagination that was previously obscured. Post-modern thought marks a feminist group shift away from dominant, positivistic ideals of objectivity and universal understanding. Instead, it acknowledges a diversity of unique human perspectives, none of which can claim absolute knowledge authority. Post-Modern feminism has thus been critiqued for having a relativist-stance, where ongoing power relations between key identities have been often neglected attention. It is possible to see this political stance in direct opposition to the "emancipatory aspirations" of women. However, Saba Mahmood would argue this critique is in some ways oppositional to global understandings of female desire, where the idea of 'freedom' is an essential, conditionally oppressive component to western feminism which may wrongly assume that women of eastern countries dominated by male power are victims needing to be liberated. As such, feminist postmodernism opposes traditional theories that justify sexist practices. Such theories perpetrate the ideas that the differences between men and women are natural, or that women have innate characteristics that justify their inferior position in society. For instance, while essentialism claims that gender identity is universal, feminist postmodernism suggests that these theories exclude marginalized groups such as lesbians and women of color. Such exclusions reproduce power relations as the heterosexual white middle-class women are assumed to represent all women.

Donna Haraway, a postmodern feminist, claims that postmodern feminism recognizes positivism as an inherently oppressive ideology, where science's rhetoric of truth was supposedly used to undermine marginalized people's agency and delegitimize 'embodied' accounts of truth. Furthermore, they argue that 'objectivity' is an external, disembodied point of view left only to privileged (unmarked bodies), because marginalized (marked bodies) cannot have perspectives dissociated from 'who they are'. Despite post-modern relativist criticism, this theory resists relativism in firmly recognizing power relations in that objectivity is a privilege of unmarked bodies. Haraway's theory of "situated knowledges" holds true to post-modern ideology, where knowledge should be placed in context; this creates a more limited range of knowledge than theoretical "objectivity", but is richer in allowing for exchange of understanding between individual experiences. Positivism inherently gives way to authoritarian positions of knowledge which hinder discussion and render limited understanding of the world. Both positivist science and relativism have been recognized as contrary to post-modern feminist thought, since both minimize the significance of context (geographic, demographic, power) on knowledge claims.

Haraway in Postmodern Bodies: Haraway introduced Biopolitics- a concept connecting policy to life- as a primary category during the Postmodern period. In one of Haraway's most famous essays, "The Biopolitics of Postmodern Bodies: Determinations of Self in Immune System Discourse," she regards the human body as a subject composed of Independent systems that interact with one another, in a political or strategic sense. According to Haraway, these bodily functions coexist while operating as separate strategic entities.

Criticism of postmodernism: Feminist postmodernism has been criticized on the basis of its rejection of the woman as a category of study and its fragmentation of perspectives. They claim that although women experience sexism differently, it is still a common characteristic among them (MacKinnon 2000). While differences exist between different classes of women, different modes of sexism may be accommodated through an intersectional approach. The postmodernism theory dissolves all groups, and supports the ideas that knowledge from any source is better than no knowledge at all (Bordo 1990).

=== Theory in the flesh ===
Post-modern feminism's assertion of "situated knowledges", plays well into Cherrie Moraga's piece "Theory in the Flesh", where the 'physical realities' of indigenous peoples' lives are said to be the means of creating a decolonial politic against oppressive, inaccessible, Eurowestern academic methods of knowledge production. In her piece, Moraga highlights the various forms of oppression that stem from various forms of discrimination. Though women of color are disproportionately stigmatized, all women, in general, suffer from societal repression. Moraga asserts that internalized racism and classism determine the disparity of treatment between blacks and whites.

This epistemological framework has been utilized by feminists like bell hooks, who claims that theorizing is often tied to a process of self-recovery and collective liberation; it is not thus limited to those in the western academic realm, nor does it require 'scientific' research. Hooks asserts that theory and practical application of emancipatory politics can, and often do, exist simultaneously and reciprocally. Post-Modern feminism has given way to the question of whether or not there should be any particular feminist ways of knowing. A 'theory in the flesh' seems to suggest that prioritizing or normalizing any specific feminist epistemology would in itself be, and has been, oppressive. According to Morgana, feminism needs to function as a united, all-inclusive body that promotes gender equality across all spectrums. Racism integrated within feminism needs to be dismantled to achieve true equity. Internalized oppression needs to be avoided at all costs because it exacerbates systematic racist and classist discrimination.

=== Feminist epistemic virtue theory ===
This theory focuses on how power and gender relations behave in terms of value theory and epistemology. Bordo's (1990) and Lloyd's (1984) examined how "maleness" and "femaleness" are used in philosophical theories and discussions about relationship such as, reason/unreason, reason/emotion and objectivity/subjectivity. Lorraine Code's (1987, 1991, 1995, 1996) with other feminist co-workers determined in which ways political and social routine shapes our identities and perspectives of our world and especially gender, how it leads to understanding of epistemic responsibility. Code's works also have been influential in epistemological fields, which can be described as version of naturalism takes and reinvents simple and uncontroversial empirical beliefs, for example the belief like "I know that I am seeing a bird", deforms the epistemic animal nature. Feminist epistemic virtue theorists rejects almost all the assumptions. Skeptical problems can not get any connections with it, so it is ignored and considered as a pseudo-problem.

== Feminist science criticism and feminist science ==
=== Feminist science criticism: bias as error ===
Feminist science criticism mainly has five different kinds of research about gender and science to address five identified biases. These are studies of how:

- Exclusion or marginalization of women scientists impair scientific progress.
- Applications of science and technology disadvantage women and other vulnerable groups and treat their interests as less important.
- Science has ignored women and gender, and how turning attention to these issues may require revisions of accepted theories.
- Biases toward working with "masculine" cognitive styles (and in some cases even the words related to them) that may — through limiting, partial, or incomplete perspective — lead to errors of omission or unjustified conclusions.
- Research into sex differences that reinforces sex stereotypes and sexist practices fail to live up to standards of good science.

=== Feminist science: bias as resource ===
Research bias is partial or limiting but not wrong if it has some empirical success and keeps off error. Such bias may be considered acceptable and suitable to serve as a basis for epistemic inquiry. They help in gaining more understanding of the world by producing new hypotheses, methods, and concepts, thus serving as epistemic resources. According to feminist philosophers, research should not be dominated by few limiting biases that exclude other generative standpoints, which would result in wider conceptions of research subjects.

Proponents of feminist science claim that scientific studies informed by feminist values are founded on sound biases that are generative limiting. This paints a pluralistic picture of science, where it appears to be disunified due to the presence of diverse structures that are not encompassed in any single theory. In other words, allowing communities to freely explore their interests reveals multiple structures and patterns. In opposing this view, some scientists claim that feminist science should follow specific methodologies and ontologies. However, this view has been opposed by supporters of pluralism, who argue that there are no unique methods for feminist science. They also claim that sticking to specific methods tends to favor certain representation types, which may also reinforce sexism.

== See also ==
- Epistemic advantage
- Feminist philosophy of science
- Social epistemology
