= Edgar A. Singer Jr. =

American philosopher (1873–1954)

Edgar Arthur Singer Jr. (November 13, 1873 – April 4, 1954) was an American philosopher, professor at the University of Pennsylvania, and proponent of experimentalism.

== Life and work ==
Singer was born in Philadelphia. He was a graduate student of George S. Fullerton (1839–1925) at the University of Pennsylvania, where he received his Ph.D. in psychology in 1894 with the thesis entitled "On the composite nature of consciousness." After his dissertation, he briefly taught at Harvard for William James as an instructor in the psychology laboratory. He was professor at the University of Pennsylvania from 1909 until 1943. His pupils included Russell L. Ackoff, Edwin Ray Guthrie, C. West Churchman, Elizabeth Flower, and Henry Bradford Smith.

Singer was an elected member of the American Philosophical Society in 1925.

Singer believed that consciousness was a historical construct and, as such, it was not a suitable object for a scientific psychology. As an object to unify psychology research, he suggested behavior, which was observable. He denied he was the father of behaviorism. He was not a materialist. Neither was Singer an empiricist. His epistemology for a science of psychology was self described as Empirical-Idealism.

Most importantly, Singer carried on the philosophy of American pragmatism, which began with Charles Sanders Peirce, a conception which was greatly extended by William James and John Dewey, to the University of Pennsylvania. Thus informing the Department Chair of philosophy Thomas A. Cowan, C. West Churchman, and Russell L. Ackoff of the merits of describing the world functionally.

== Publications ==
- 1923, Modern thinkers and present problems
- 1924, Mind as behavior
- 1925, Fool's advice
- 1936, On the contented life
- 1948, In search of a way of life
- 1959, Experience and reflection
