= Positionality =

Positionality may refer to:

- Positional good, an economic good whose value is determined by its distribution within a population
- Positionality statement, a statement whereby a person, such as a researcher or teacher, describes, lists and reflects on their group identities.
- Standpoint theory, a postmodern theory for analyzing inter-subjective discourses

== See also ==
- Perspectivism, the philosophical view that all ideations take place from particular perspectives, and that there are many possible conceptual schemes in which judgment of truth or value can be made
