= Standpoint theory =

Academic theory on epistemic perspectives

Standpoint theory, also known as standpoint epistemology, is a foundational framework in social theory that examines how individuals' unique perspectives, shaped by their social and political experiences, influence their understanding of the world. Standpoint theory proposes that authority is rooted in individuals' personal knowledge and perspectives and the power that such authority exerts.

First originating in feminist philosophy, this theory posits that marginalized groups, situated as "outsiders within," offer valuable insights that challenge dominant perspectives and contribute to a more comprehensive understanding of societal dynamics. Standpoint theory's central concept is that an individual's perspectives are shaped by their social and political experiences. The amalgamation of a person's experiences forms a standpoint—a point of view—through which that individual sees and understands the world. In response to critiques that early standpoint theory treated social perspectives as monolithic or essentialized, social theorists understand standpoints as multifaceted rather than unvarying or absolute. For example, while Hispanic women may generally share some perspectives, particularly with regard to ethnicity and gender, they are not defined solely by these viewpoints; despite some common features, there is no essentially Hispanic female identity.

Standpoint theorists emphasize the utility of a naturalistic, or everyday experiential, concept of knowing (i.e., epistemology). One's standpoint (whether reflexively considered or not) shapes which concepts are intelligible, which claims are heard and understood by whom, which features of the world are perceptually salient, which reasons are understood to be relevant and forceful, and which conclusions credible.

Standpoint theory supports what feminist theorist Sandra Harding calls strong objectivity, or the notion that the perspectives of marginalized and/or oppressed individuals can help to create more objective accounts of the world. Through the outsider-within phenomenon, these individuals are placed in a unique position to point to patterns of behavior that those immersed in the dominant group culture are unable to recognize. Standpoint theory gives voice to the marginalized groups by allowing them to challenge the status quo as the outsider within the status quo representing the dominant position of privilege.

The predominant culture in which all groups exist is not experienced in the same way by all persons or groups. The views of those who belong to groups with more social power are validated more than those in marginalized groups. Those in marginalized groups must learn to be bicultural, or to "pass" in the dominant culture to survive, even though that perspective is not their own.

== History ==
=== First-wave standpoint theory ===
First-wave standpoint theory emerged in the 1970s and 1980s, spearheaded by feminist philosophers like Sandra Harding. In Harding's 1986 book The Science Question in Feminism, she introduced the term "standpoint" to distinguish it from a generic perspective, emphasizing the requirement of political engagement. It aimed to challenge conventional notions of objectivity and neutrality in scientific inquiry by foregrounding the political engagement and lived experiences of marginalized groups, particularly women. Harding argues that the political engagement of feminists and their active focus on the lives of women allows them to have an epistemically privileged "standpoint". Harding also maintained that it is the marginalized groups that ultimately provide the clearest view on the true opportunities and obstacles faced in society.

Feminist standpoint theory's initial focus was in challenging the idea of scientific neutrality and objectivity from a presupposed generalized knower. This wave of standpoint theory underscored how gendered identities influence individuals' epistemic resources and capacities, impacting their access to knowledge. By centering the experiences of women, first-wave standpoint theorists sought to dismantle patriarchal structures in knowledge production and highlight the epistemic privilege inherent in marginalized perspectives.

Some uses of standpoint theory have been based in Hegelian and Marxist theory, such as Hegel's study of the different standpoints of slaves and masters in 1807. Hegel, a German Idealist, claimed that the master-slave relationship is about people's belonging positions, and the groups affect how people receive knowledge and power. Hegel's influence can be seen in some later feminist studies. For example, Nancy Hartsock examined standpoint theory by using relations between men and women. She published "The Feminist Standpoint: Developing Ground for a Specifically Feminist Historical Materialism" in 1983. Hartsock used Hegel's master–slave dialectic and Marx's theory of class and capitalism as an inspiration to look into matters of sex and gender.

=== Second-wave standpoint theory ===
Standpoint theory evolved to focus on the social positions such as gender, race, social class, culture, and economic status. Standpoint theory seeks to develop a particular feminist epistemology, that values the experiences of women and minorities as a source for knowledge.

Prominent standpoint theorists include Dorothy Smith, Nancy Hartsock, Donna Haraway, Sandra Harding, Alison Wylie, Lynette Hunter and Patricia Hill Collins. Second-wave standpoint theorists and activists in the United States developed the related concept of intersectionality to examine oppressions caused by the interactions between social factors such as gender, race, sexuality, and culture. For example, intersectionality can explain how social factors contribute to divisions of labor in the workforce. Though intersectionality was developed to consider social and philosophical issues, it has been applied in a range of academic areas like higher education, identity politics, and geography.

=== Third-wave standpoint theory ===
Contemporary standpoint theory is evolving as a response to changes in the political and economic landscape, like the first female and person of color Vice President of the United States, Kamala Harris, the global pandemic and the overturning of Roe v. Wade. In modern times, third-wave feminism emphasizes inclusive community and action. This has resulted in a resurgence of feminist activism and further integration of intersecting identities, like the unique perspective of Black women and abortion rights.

Standpoint theorist, Patricia Hill Collins, highlights the resonance of Standpoint Theory with Black feminist groups, in that, standpoint theory can be used as a framework for understanding Black feminist thought. Standpoint theory can be a framework for understanding the oppression of Black women or what feminist theorist Catherine E. Harnois coins as the "Black women's standpoint".

== Key concepts ==
Generally, standpoint theory gives insight into specific circumstances only available to the members of a certain collective standpoint. According to Michael Ryan, "the idea of a collective standpoint does not imply an essential overarching characteristic but rather a sense of belonging to a group bounded by a shared experience." Kristina Rolin criticizes common misunderstandings of standpoint theory that include "the assumption of essentialism that all women share the same socially grounded perspective in virtue of being women, the assumption of automatic epistemic privilege is that epistemic advantage accrues to the subordinate automatically, just in virtue of their occupying a particular social position." She suggests that, on the contrary, neither assumptions are part of standpoint theory. According to standpoint theory:

- A standpoint is a place from which human beings view the world.
- A standpoint influences how the people adopting it socially construct the world.
- A standpoint is a mental position from which things are viewed.
- A standpoint is a position from which objects or principles are viewed and according to which they are compared and judged.
- The inequalities of different social groups create differences in their standpoints.
- All standpoints are partial; so (for example) standpoint feminism coexists with other standpoints.

=== Key terms ===
1. Social location: Viewpoints and perspectives are ultimately created through the groups that we subscribe to (created by connections through race, gender, etc.).
2. Epistemology: The theory of knowledge
3. Intersectionality: The characteristics of an individual's life, such as race and gender, that come together to create all aspects of one's identity.
4. Matrix of domination: Societal systems put in place that support the dominant group's power.
5. Local knowledge: Knowledge that is rooted in an individual's beliefs, experiences, along with time and place.

== Applications ==
Since standpoint theory focuses on marginalized populations, it is often applied within fields that focus on these populations. Standpoint has been referenced as a concept that should be acknowledged and understood in the social work field, especially when approaching and assisting clients. Social workers seek to understand the concept of positionality within dynamic systems to encourage empathy. Many marginalized populations rely on the welfare system to survive. Those who structure the welfare system typically have never needed to utilize its services before. Standpoint theory has been presented as a method to improving the welfare system by recognizing suggestions made by those within the welfare system. In Africa, standpoint theory has catalyzed a social movement where women are introduced to the radio in order to promote awareness of their experiences and hardships and to help these women heal and find closure. Another example dealing with Africa is slavery and how slavery differed greatly depending on if one was the slave or the master. If there were any power relationships, there could never be a single perspective. No viewpoint could ever be complete, and there is no limit to anyone's perspective.

Asante and Davis's (1989) study of interracial encounters in the workplace found that because of different cultural perspectives, approaching organizational interactions with others with different beliefs, assumptions, and meanings often leads to miscommunication. Brenda Allen stated in her research that, "Organizational members' experiences, attitudes, and behaviors in the workplace are often influenced by race-ethnicity."

Paul Adler and John Jermier suggest that management scholars should be aware of their standpoints. They write that those studying management should "consciously choose [their] standpoints and take responsibility for the impact (or lack of impact) of [their] scholarship on the world."

Jermier argued that all parts of a research study – identifying the problem, theorizing research questions, gathering and analyzing data, drawing conclusions, and the knowledge produced – are there to some extent because of the researcher's standpoint. This caused him to question what standpoint to adopt in the management of scientists. To avoid falling into limitations of the status quo and certain standpoints, he said that "the view from below has greater potential to generate more complete and more objective knowledge claims." He continues to say that "if our desire is to heal the world, we will learn more about how the root mechanisms of the world work and about how things can be changed by adopting the standpoints of those people and other parts of nature that most deeply suffer its wounds."

== Feminist standpoint theory ==
Feminist standpoint theorists make three principal claims: (1) Knowledge is socially situated. (2) Marginalized groups are socially situated in ways that make it more possible for them to be aware of things and ask questions than it is for the non-marginalized. (3) Research, particularly that focused on power relations, should begin with the lives of the marginalized.

Specifically, feminist standpoint theory is guided by four main theses: strong objectivity, the situated knowledge, epistemic advantage, and power relations.

Feminist standpoint theorists such as Dorothy Smith, Patricia Hill Collins, Nancy Hartsock, and Sandra Harding claimed that certain socio-political positions occupied by women (and by extension other groups who lack social and economic privilege) can become sites of epistemic privilege and thus productive starting points for inquiry into questions about not only those who are socially and politically marginalized, but also those who, by dint of social and political privilege, occupy the positions of oppressors. This claim was specifically generated by Sandra Harding and as such, "Starting off research from women's lives will generate less partial and distorted accounts not only of women's lives but also of men’s lives and of the whole social order." This practice is also quite evident when women enter into professions that are considered to be male oriented. Londa Schiebinger states, "While women now study at prestigious universities at about the same rate as men, they are rarely invited to join the faculty at top universities ... The sociologist Harriet Zuckerman has observed that 'the more prestigious the institution, the longer women wait to be promoted.' Men, generally speaking, face no such trade-off."

Standpoint feminists have been concerned with these dualisms for two related reasons. First, dualisms usually imply a hierarchical relationship between the terms, elevating one and devaluing the other. Also, related to this issue is the concern that these dualisms often become gendered in our culture. In this process, men are associated with one extreme and women with the other. In the case of reason and emotion, women are identified with emotion. Because our culture values emotion less than reason, women suffer from this association. Feminist critics are usually concerned with the fact that dualisms force false dichotomies (partition of a whole) onto women and men, failing to see that life is less either/or than both/and, as relational dialectics theory holds.

== Indigenous standpoint theory ==
Indigenous standpoint theory is an intricate theoretical approach in how indigenous people navigate the difficulties of their experiences within spaces which contest their epistemology. Utility of this approach stems from diverse background of marginalized groups across societies and cultures whose unique experiences have been rejected and suppressed within a majoritarian intellectual knowledge production. However, the analysis of these experiences is not the cycle of accumulation of stories, of lived experiences, and in turn, does not produce limitless subjective narratives to obstruct objective knowledge. Martin Nakata is the foremost propounder of indigenous standpoint theory.

Indigenous standpoint, as well as feminist theory, expect the "knower" to address their social status of privilege to those they are researching. When addressing ourselves as "knowers" into the setting, the intention is not to realign the focus, but rather to include the social relations within what we as "knowers" know. This is a matter of respect as the researcher is expected to declare who they are and on what basis they write. This "self-awareness is fundamental to the research process because it should result in a researcher role that is respectful and not disruptive, aggressive or controlling".

An Indigenous "knower" does not possess a predisposed "readymade critical stance" on the world, but rather questions that must be answered before objective knowledge is obtained. Thus, this engagement enables us to create a critical Indigenous standpoint. This in itself does not determine truth; instead, it produces a range potential argument with further possible answers. The arguments established, however, still require its basis to be rational and reasonable and answer the logic and assumptions on which they were established. Thus, arguments cannot assert a claim of truth on an idea because they, the Indigenous individual, are a part of the Indigenous community as the theory would not allow to authorise themselves solely truthful on the basis of their experience. Indigenous standpoint theory is facilitated by three principles, defined by Martin Nakata.

- Nakata's first principle states: "It would, therefore, begin from the premise that my social position is discursively constituted within and constitutive of complex set of social relations as expressed through social organization of my every day". This denotes that one’s social position is established and acknowledgement of social relations within factors such as social, political, economic and cultural, impacts and influence who you are and structure your everyday life.
- Nakata's second principle states: "This experience as a push-pull between Indigenous and non-Indigenous positions; that is, the familiar confusion with constantly being asked at any one moment to both agree and disagree with any proposition on the basis of a constrained choice between a whitefella or blackfella perspective". This signifies that the position of which Indigenous people hold at the cultural interface to decide a continuous stance is recognized. Instead, reorganization for Indigenous agency should be constituted on what they know from this position. Simplistically stated, it is questioning why Indigenous people should have to choose positions instead of share what they know from both.
- Nakata's third and last principle states: "the idea that the constant 'tensions' that this tug-of-war creates are physically experienced, and both inform as well as limit what can be said and what is to be left unsaid in every day." Nakata here is describing the physical worlds of how Indigenous and non-Indigenous differ in everyday context, and how these differences can inform of limit has it might be unacceptable in western colonist society that would otherwise be acceptable with other Indigenous people.

Nakata states that these three principles allow him to forge a critical standpoint from the cultural interface and enable him to create better arguments in relation to his position within epistemologies and with other groups of "knowers". However, one cannot overturn a position one is dominant in just because of one's background due to the arguments being simplistic or misrepresented with no evidence to support itself etc.

Thus, Indigenous standpoint theory can be defined as a "method of inquiry, a process for making more intelligible 'the corpus of objectified knowledge about us' as it emerges and organizes understanding of ... lived realities".

== Criticisms ==
Critics argue that standpoint theory, despite challenging essentialism, relies itself on essentialism, as it focuses on the dualism of subjectivity and objectivity. In regard to feminist standpoint theory: though it does dispel many false generalizations of women, it is argued that focus on social groups and social classes of women is still inherently essentialist. Generalizations across the entire female gender can be broken into smaller more specific groups pertaining to women's different social classes and cultures, but are still generalized as distinct groups, and thus marginalization still occurs. West and Turner state that Catherine O'Leary (1997) argued that although standpoint theory has helped reclaim women's experiences as suitable research topics, it contains a problematic emphasis on the universality of this experience, at the expense of differences among women's experiences.

Another main criticism of Harding and Wood's standpoint theory is the credibility of strong objectivity vs. subjectivity. Standpoint theorists argue that standpoints are relative and cannot be evaluated by any absolute criteria but make the assumption that the oppressed are less biased or more impartial than the privileged. This leaves open the possibility of an overbalance of power, in which the oppressed group intentionally or unintentionally becomes the oppressor. Intentional overbalance of power, or revenge, can manifest as justification for extremism and militarism, which can sometimes be seen in more extreme forms of feminism.

While standpoint theory began with a critical Marxist view of social-class oppression, it developed in the 1970s and 1980s along with changes in feminist philosophy. Other groups, as of now, need to be included into the theory and a new emphasis needs to be made toward other marginalized or muted groups. When Harding and Wood created standpoint theory, they did not account for how different cultures can exist within the same social group. "Early standpoint theorists sought to understand the way in which the gendered identity of knowers affected their epistemic resources and capacities". These other muted or marginalized groups have a more realistic approach to standpoint theory as they have different experiences than those that are in power and even within those muted groups differences defined by different cultures of people can have an altered standpoint. This view gives a basis to a central principle of standpoint theory—the inversion thesis. Academic Joshua St. Pierre defines the inversion thesis as giving "epistemic authority to those marginalized by systems of oppression insofar as these people are often better knowers than those who benefit from oppression. Put simply: social dispossession produces epistemic privilege."

Wylie has perhaps provided the most succinct articulation of second-wave standpoint theory. For her, a standpoint does not mark out a clearly defined territory such as "women" within which members have automatic privilege but is a rather a posture of epistemic engagement. Responding to the claim that the situated knowledge thesis reifies essentialism, Wylie argues that it is "an open (empirical) question whether such structures obtain in a given context, what form they take, and how they are internalized or embodied by individuals". Identities are complex and cannot be reduced to simple binaries. Likewise, she argues that the criticism of automatic privilege falters insofar as a standpoint is never given but is achieved (St. Pierre). This can be seen as an instance of moving the goalposts.

== See also ==
- Co-cultural communication theory
- Critical race theory
- Cultural studies
- Groupthink
- Muted group theory
- Perspectivism
- Positionality statement
- Quill Kukla
- Spiral of silence
- Standpoint feminism
