= Strong objectivity =

Strong objectivity is a term coined by feminist philosopher Sandra Harding, known for her work on feminist standpoint theory. Harding suggests that starting research from the lives of women "actually strengthens standards of objectivity". Strong objectivity can be contrasted with the "weak objectivity" of supposed value-neutral research. Strong objectivity is posited in contrast to scientific objectivity since strong objectivity amplifies researcher bias, something that Harding argues can never really be removed; a researcher's life experiences will always be a lens through which they view the world and subsequently their research.

From a feminist standpoint, the question of objectivity stems from what kinds of knowledge projects are objective and which are not, and why; whether or not objectivity is necessary; and how, or if, it is possible to achieve objectivity. These considerations arise at least in part from concerns about sexism and androcentric bias in dominant scientific life and studies.

Strong objectivity argues that there is androcentric bias in research because male researchers attempt to be a neutral researcher, where Harding argues that is not possible. Harding suggests researcher reflexivity, or consideration of the researcher's positionality, and how that affects their research, as a "stronger" objectivity than researchers claiming to be completely neutral. Knowledge and the biases affecting it must be equally judged by the scientific community and located in social history.

== See also ==
- Positionality statement
- Relativism
- Standpoint theory
- View from nowhere
