= Empiricism =

Idea that knowledge comes only/mainly from sensory experience

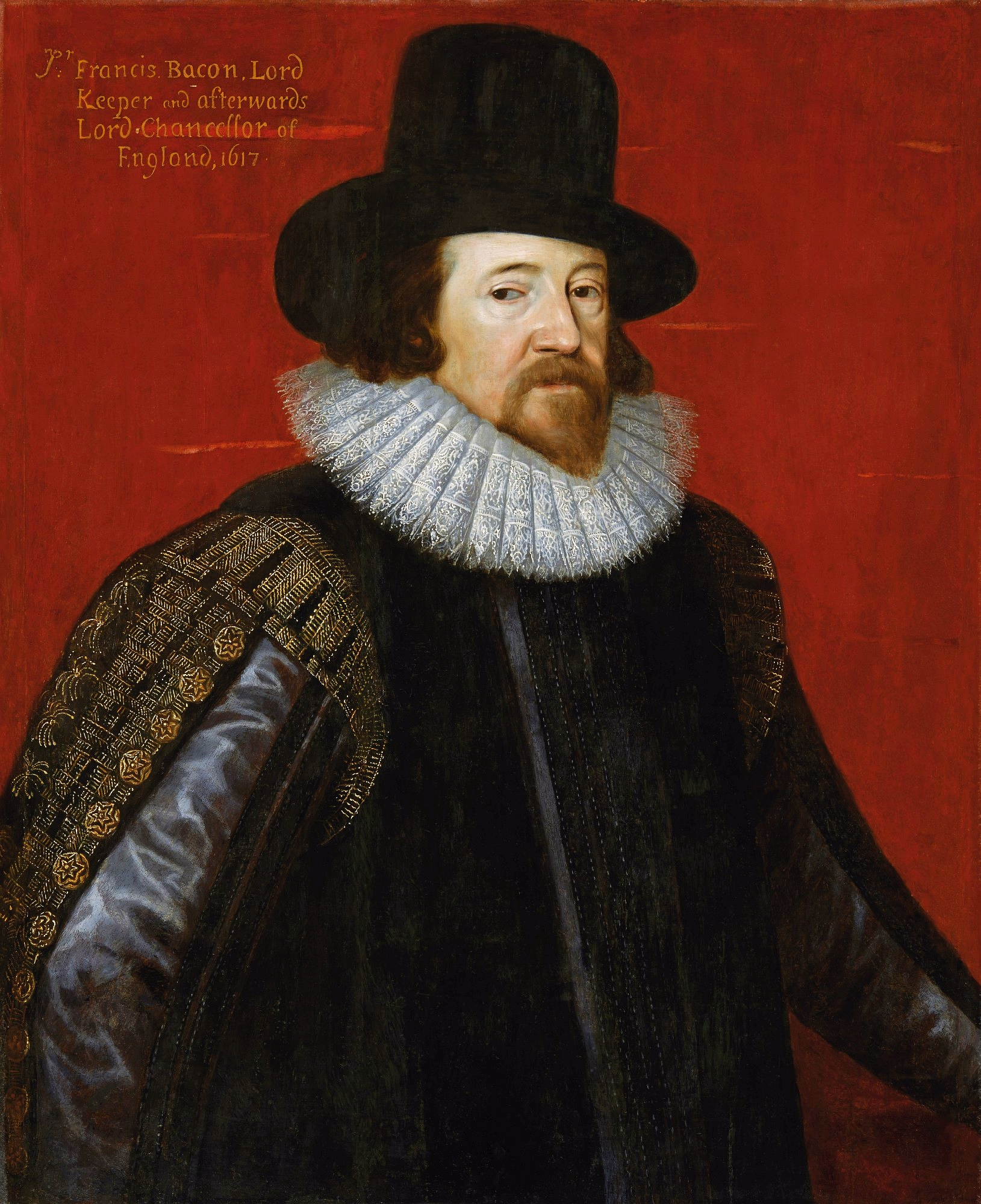
Francis Bacon

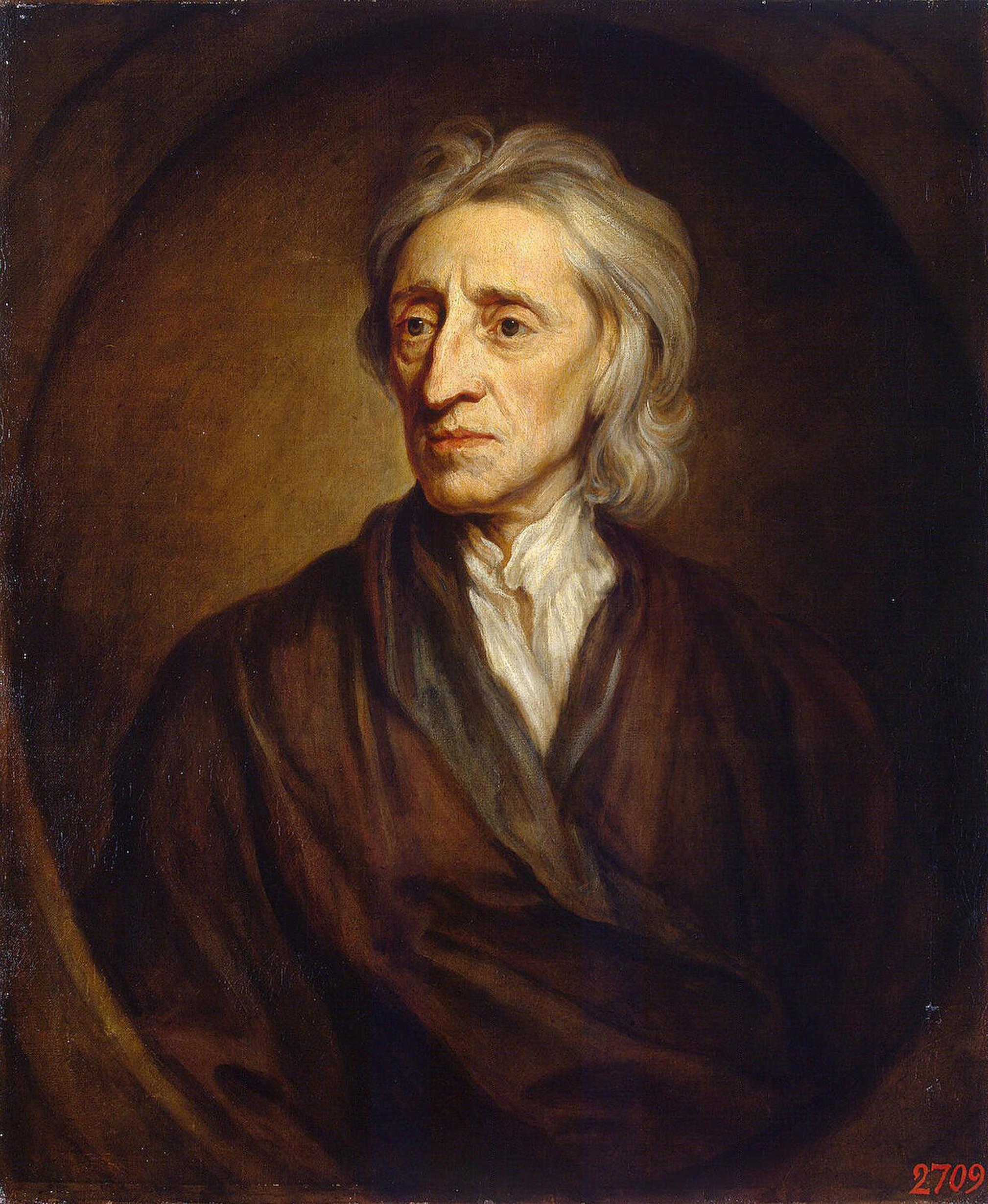
John Locke

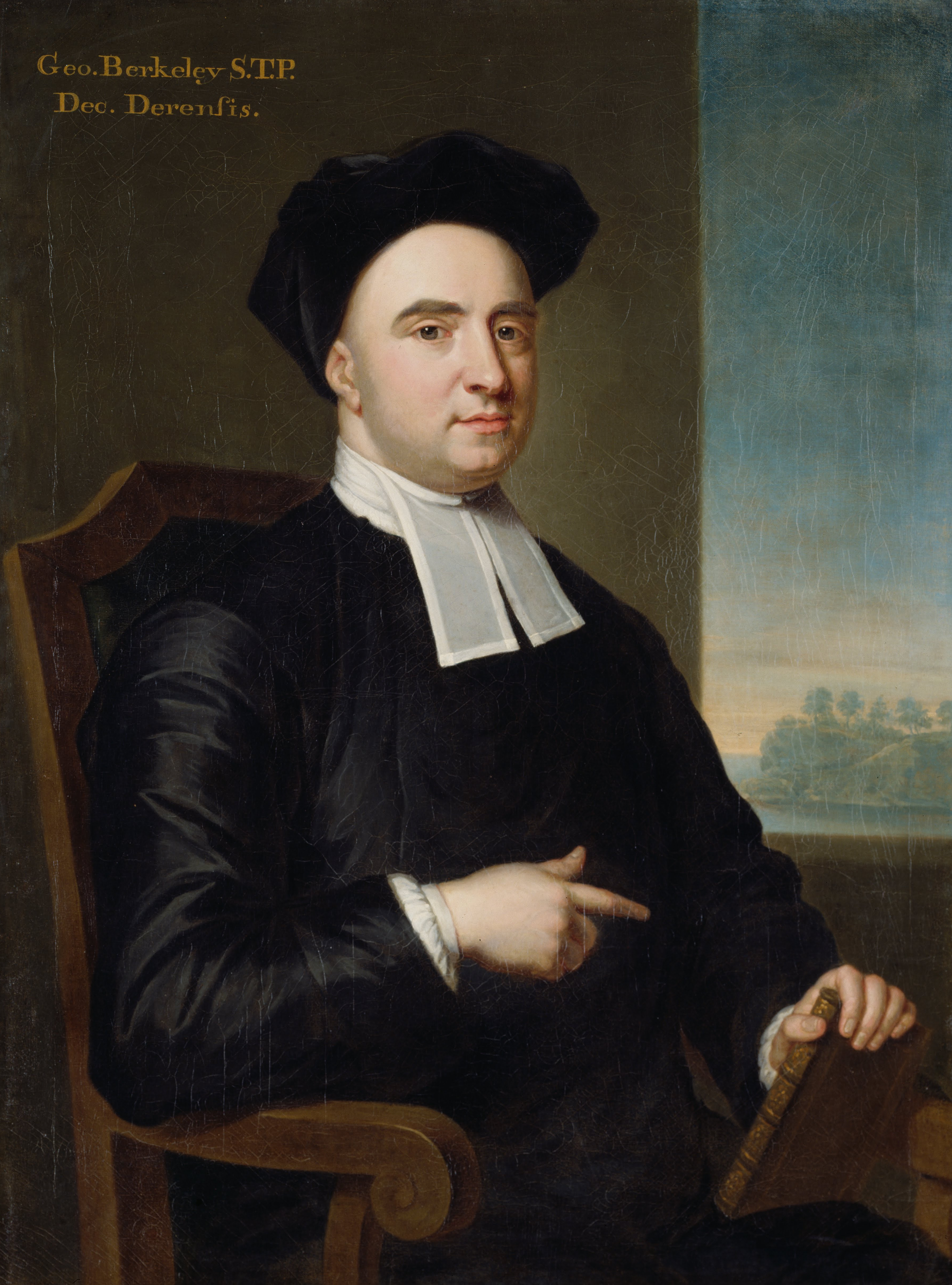
George Berkeley

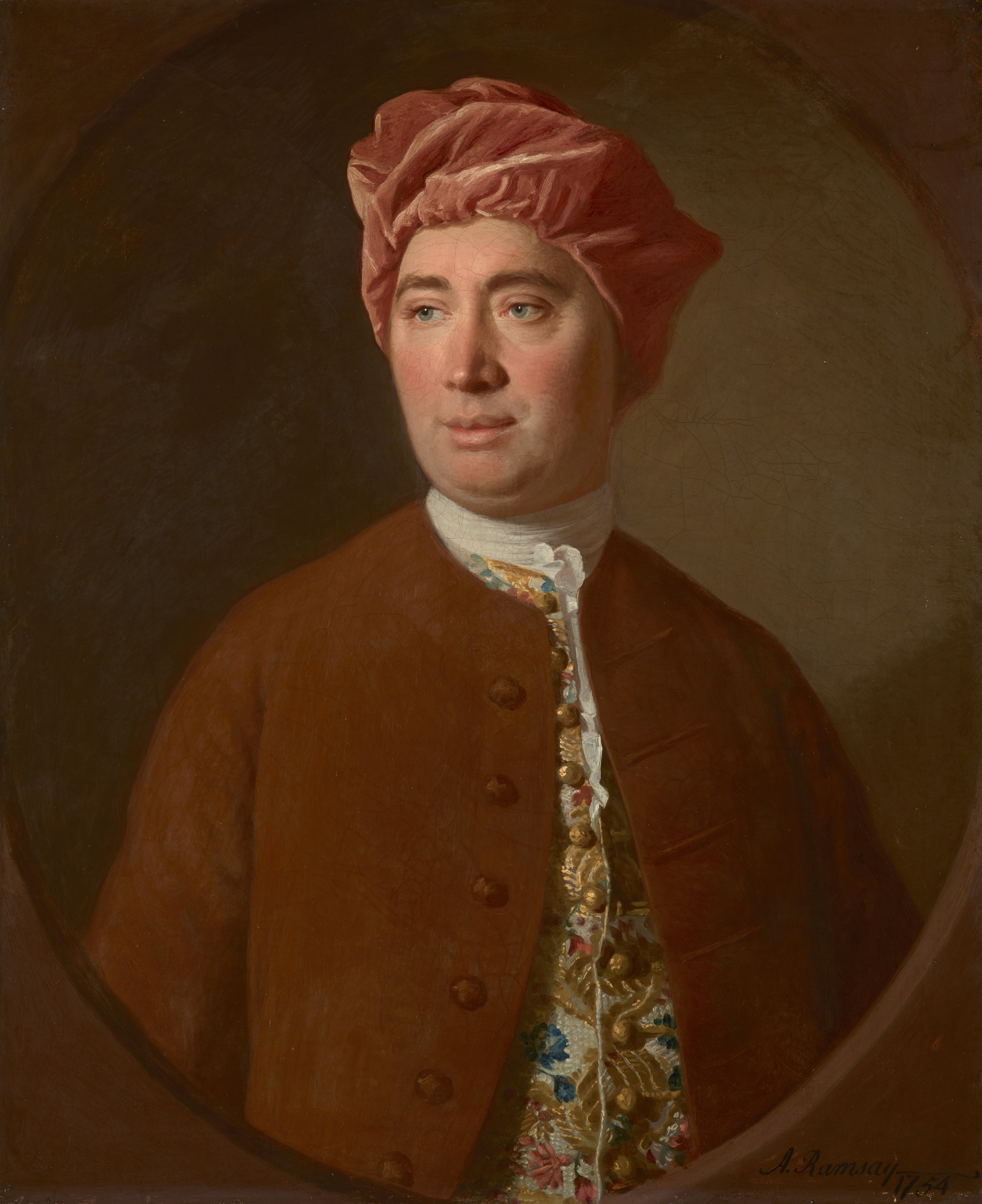
David Hume

Empiricism is an epistemological view in philosophy which holds that true knowledge or justification comes either only or primarily from sensory experience and empirical evidence. It is one of several competing views within epistemology, along with rationalism and skepticism. Empiricists argue that empiricism is a more reliable method of finding the truth than relying purely on logical reasoning, because humans have cognitive biases and limitations which lead to errors of judgement.

Empiricism emphasizes the central role of empirical evidence in the formation of ideas, rather than innate ideas or traditions. Empiricists may argue that traditions (or customs) arise due to relations of previous sensory experiences. Historically, empiricism was associated with the "blank slate" concept (tabula rasa), according to which the human mind is "blank" at birth and develops its thoughts only through later experience.

Empiricism in the philosophy of science emphasizes evidence, especially as discovered in experiments. It is a fundamental part of the scientific method that all hypotheses and theories must be tested against observations of the natural world rather than resting solely on a priori reasoning, intuition, or revelation. Empiricism, often used by natural scientists, holds that "knowledge is based on experience" and that "knowledge is tentative and probabilistic, subject to continued revision and falsification". Empirical research, including experiments and validated measurement tools, guides the scientific method.

== Etymology ==
The English term empirical derives from the Ancient Greek word ἐμπειρία, empeiria, which is cognate with and translates to the Latin experientia, from which the words experience and experiment are derived.

== Background ==
A central concept in science and the scientific method is that conclusions must be empirically based on the evidence of the senses. Both natural and social sciences use working hypotheses that are testable by observation and experiment. The term semi-empirical is sometimes used to describe theoretical methods that make use of basic axioms, established scientific laws, and previous experimental results to engage in reasoned model building and theoretical inquiry.

Philosophical empiricists hold no knowledge to be properly inferred or deduced unless it is derived from one's sense-based experience. In epistemology (theory of knowledge) empiricism is typically contrasted with rationalism, which holds that knowledge may be derived from reason independently of the senses, and in the philosophy of mind it is often contrasted with innatism, which holds that some knowledge and ideas are already present in the mind at birth. However, many Enlightenment rationalists and empiricists still made concessions to each other. For example, the empiricist John Locke admitted that some knowledge (e.g. knowledge of God's existence) could be arrived at through intuition and reasoning alone. Similarly, Robert Boyle, a prominent advocate of the experimental method, held that we also have innate ideas. At the same time, the main continental rationalists (Descartes, Spinoza, and Leibniz) were also advocates of the empirical "scientific method".

== History ==
=== Early empiricism ===
Aristotle

Between 600 and 200 BCE, the Vaisheshika school of Hindu philosophy, founded by the ancient Indian philosopher Kanada, accepted perception and inference as the only two reliable sources of knowledge. This is enumerated in his work Vaiśeṣika Sūtra. The Charvaka school held similar beliefs, asserting that perception is the only reliable source of knowledge while inference obtains knowledge with uncertainty.

The earliest Western proto-empiricists were the empiric school of ancient Greek medical practitioners, founded in 330 BCE. Its members rejected the doctrines of the dogmatic school, preferring to rely on the observation of phantasiai (i.e., phenomena, the appearances). The Empiric school was closely allied with the Pyrrhonist school of philosophy, which made the philosophical case for their proto-empiricism.

The notion of tabula rasa ("clean slate" or "blank tablet") connotes a view of the mind as an originally blank or empty recorder (Locke used the words "white paper") on which experience leaves marks. This denies that humans have innate ideas. The notion dates back to Aristotle, c. 350 BC:

What the mind (nous) thinks must be in it in the same sense as letters are on a tablet (grammateion) which bears no actual writing (grammenon); this is just what happens in the case of the mind. (Aristotle, On the Soul, 3.4.430^{a}1).

Aristotle's explanation of how this was possible was not strictly empiricist in a modern sense, but rather based on his theory of potentiality and actuality, and experience of sense perceptions still requires the help of the active nous. These notions contrasted with Platonic notions of the human mind as an entity that pre-existed somewhere in the heavens, before being sent down to join a body on Earth (see Plato's Phaedo and Apology, as well as others). Aristotle was considered to give a more important position to sense perception than Plato, and commentators in the Middle Ages summarized one of his positions as "nihil in intellectu nisi prius fuerit in sensu" (Latin for "nothing in the intellect without first being in the senses").

This idea was later developed in ancient philosophy by the Stoic school, from about 330 BCE. Stoic epistemology generally emphasizes that the mind starts blank, but acquires knowledge as the outside world is impressed upon it. The doxographer Aetius summarizes this view as "When a man is born, the Stoics say, he has the commanding part of his soul like a sheet of paper ready for writing upon."

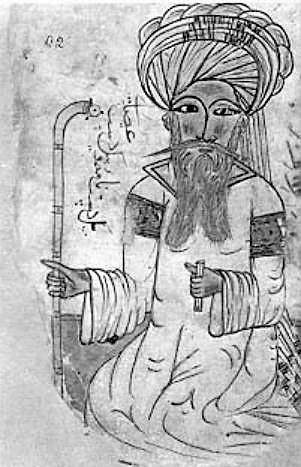
A drawing of Ibn Sina (Avicenna) from 1271

=== Islamic Golden Age and Pre-Renaissance (5th to 15th centuries CE) ===
During the Middle Ages (from the 5th to the 15th century CE) Aristotle's theory of tabula rasa was developed by Islamic philosophers starting with Al Farabi (c. 872 – c. 951 CE), developing into an elaborate theory by Avicenna (c. 980 – 1037 CE) and demonstrated as a thought experiment by Ibn Tufail. For Avicenna (Ibn Sina), for example, the tabula rasa is a pure potentiality that is actualized through education, and knowledge is attained through "empirical familiarity with objects in this world from which one abstracts universal concepts" developed through a "syllogistic method of reasoning in which observations lead to propositional statements which when compounded lead to further abstract concepts". The intellect itself develops from a material intellect (al-'aql al-hayulani), which is a potentiality "that can acquire knowledge to the active intellect (al-'aql al-fa'il), the state of the human intellect in conjunction with the perfect source of knowledge". So the immaterial "active intellect", separate from any individual person, is still essential for understanding to occur.

In the 12th century CE, the Andalusian Muslim philosopher and novelist Abu Bakr Ibn Tufail (known as "Abubacer" or "Ebu Tophail" in the West) included the theory of tabula rasa as a thought experiment in his Arabic philosophical novel, Hayy ibn Yaqdhan in which he depicted the development of the mind of a feral child "from a tabula rasa to that of an adult, in complete isolation from society" on a desert island, through experience alone. The Latin translation of his philosophical novel, entitled Philosophus Autodidactus, published by Edward Pococke the Younger in 1671, had an influence on John Locke's formulation of tabula rasa in An Essay Concerning Human Understanding.

A similar Islamic theological novel, Theologus Autodidactus, was written by the Arab theologian and physician Ibn al-Nafis in the 13th century. It also dealt with the theme of empiricism through the story of a feral child on a desert island, but departed from its predecessor by depicting the development of the protagonist's mind through contact with society rather than in isolation from society.

During the 13th century Thomas Aquinas adopted into scholasticism the Aristotelian position that the senses are essential to the mind. Bonaventure (1221–1274), one of Aquinas' strongest intellectual opponents, offered some of the strongest arguments in favour of the Platonic idea of the mind.

=== Renaissance Italy ===
In the late renaissance various writers began to question the medieval and classical understanding of knowledge acquisition in a more fundamental way. In political and historical writing Niccolò Machiavelli and his friend Francesco Guicciardini initiated a new realistic style of writing. Machiavelli in particular was scornful of writers on politics who judged everything in comparison to mental ideals and demanded that people should study the "effectual truth" instead. Their contemporary, Leonardo da Vinci (1452–1519) said, "If you find from your own experience that something is a fact and it contradicts what some authority has written down, then you must abandon the authority and base your reasoning on your own findings."

Significantly, an empirical metaphysical system was developed by the Italian philosopher Bernardino Telesio which had an enormous impact on the development of later Italian thinkers, including Telesio's students Antonio Persio and Sertorio Quattromani, his contemporaries Thomas Campanella and Giordano Bruno, and later British philosophers such as Francis Bacon, who regarded Telesio as "the first of the moderns". Telesio's influence can also be seen on the French philosophers René Descartes and Pierre Gassendi.

The decidedly anti-Aristotelian and anti-clerical music theorist Vincenzo Galilei (c. 1520 – 1591), father of Galileo and the inventor of monody, made use of the method in successfully solving musical problems, firstly, of tuning such as the relationship of pitch to string tension and mass in stringed instruments, and to volume of air in wind instruments; and secondly to composition, by his various suggestions to composers in his Dialogo della musica antica e moderna (Florence, 1581). The Italian word he used for "experiment" was esperimento. It is known that he was the essential pedagogical influence upon the young Galileo, his eldest son (cf. Coelho, ed. Music and Science in the Age of Galileo Galilei), arguably one of the most influential empiricists in history. Vincenzo, through his tuning research, found the underlying truth at the heart of the misunderstood myth of 'Pythagoras' hammers' (the square of the numbers concerned yielded those musical intervals, not the actual numbers, as believed), and through this and other discoveries that demonstrated the fallibility of traditional authorities, a radically empirical attitude developed, passed on to Galileo, which regarded "experience and demonstration" as the sine qua non of valid rational enquiry.

=== British empiricism ===
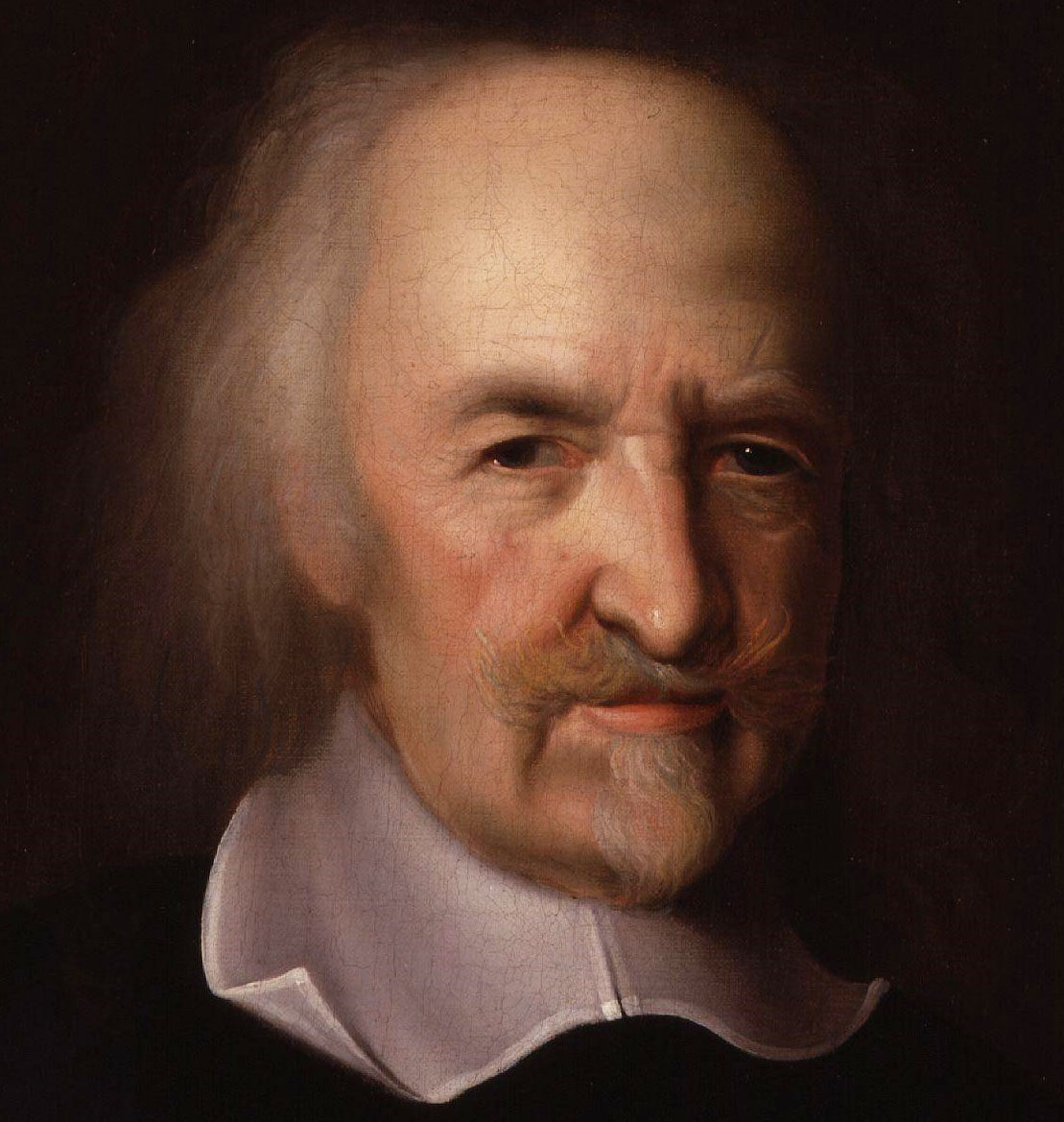
Thomas Hobbes

British empiricism, a retrospective characterization, emerged during the 17th century as an approach to early modern philosophy and modern science. Although both integral to this overarching transition, Francis Bacon, in England, first advocated for empiricism in 1620 (in his Novum Organum), whereas René Descartes, in France, laid the main groundwork upholding rationalism in 1641 (in his Meditations on First Philosophy). (Bacon's natural philosophy was influenced by Italian philosopher Bernardino Telesio and by Swiss physician Paracelsus.) Contributing later in the 17th century, Thomas Hobbes and Baruch Spinoza are retrospectively identified likewise as an empiricist and a rationalist, respectively. In the Enlightenment of the late 17th century, John Locke in England, and in the 18th century, both George Berkeley in Ireland and David Hume in Scotland, all became leading exponents of empiricism, hence the dominance of empiricism in British philosophy. The distinction between rationalism and empiricism was not formally made until Immanuel Kant, in Germany, who sought to merge the two views in his Critique of Pure Reason (1781).

In response to the early-to-mid-17th-century "continental rationalism", John Locke (1632–1704) proposed in An Essay Concerning Human Understanding (1689) a very influential view wherein the only knowledge humans can have is a posteriori, i.e., based upon experience. Locke is famously attributed with holding the proposition that the human mind is a tabula rasa, a "blank tablet", in Locke's words "white paper", on which the experiences derived from sense impressions as a person's life proceeds are written.

There are two sources of our ideas: sensation and reflection. In both cases, a distinction is made between simple and complex ideas. The former are unanalysable, and are broken down into primary and secondary qualities. Primary qualities are essential for the object in question to be what it is. Without specific primary qualities, an object would not be what it is. For example, an apple is an apple because of the arrangement of its atomic structure. If an apple were structured differently, it would cease to be an apple. Secondary qualities are the sensory information we can perceive from its primary qualities. For example, an apple can be perceived in various colours, sizes, and textures but it is still identified as an apple. Therefore, its primary qualities dictate what the object essentially is, while its secondary qualities define its attributes. Complex ideas combine simple ones, and divide into substances, modes, and relations. According to Locke, our knowledge of things is a perception of ideas that are in accordance or discordance with each other, which is very different from the quest for certainty of Descartes.

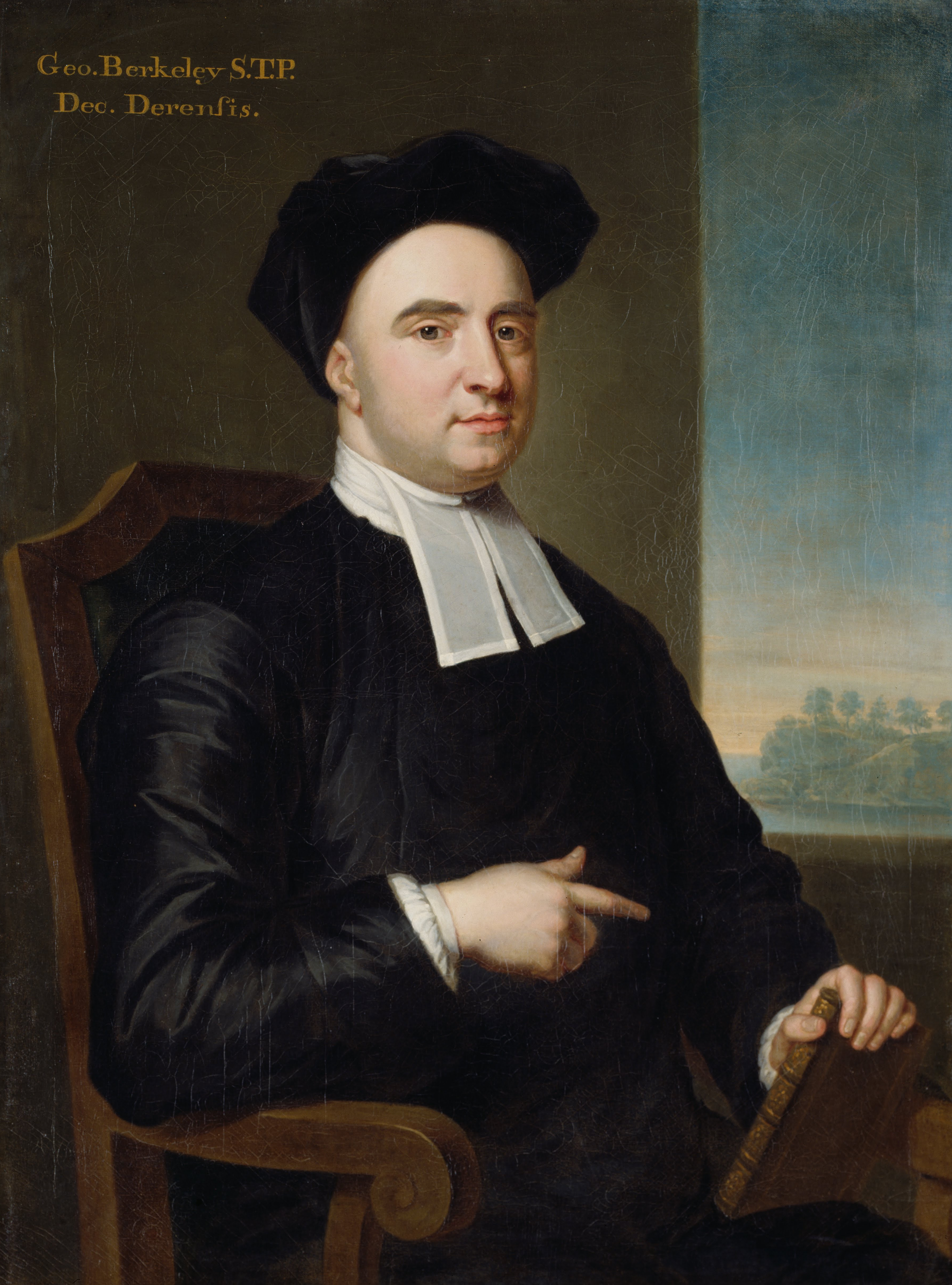
George Berkeley

A generation later, the Irish Anglican bishop George Berkeley (1685–1753) determined that Locke's view immediately opened a door that would lead to eventual atheism. In response to Locke, he put forth in his Treatise Concerning the Principles of Human Knowledge (1710) an important challenge to empiricism in which things only exist either as a result of their being perceived, or by virtue of the fact that they are an entity doing the perceiving. (For Berkeley, God fills in for humans by doing the perceiving whenever humans are not around to do it.) In his text Alciphron, Berkeley maintained that any order humans may see in nature is the language or handwriting of God. Berkeley's approach to empiricism would later come to be called subjective idealism.

Scottish philosopher David Hume (1711–1776) responded to Berkeley's criticisms of Locke, as well as other differences between early modern philosophers, and moved empiricism to a new level of skepticism. Hume argued in keeping with the empiricist view that all knowledge derives from sense experience, but he accepted that this has implications not normally acceptable to philosophers. He wrote for example, "Locke divides all arguments into demonstrative and probable. On this view, we must say that it is only probable that all men must die or that the sun will rise to-morrow, because neither of these can be demonstrated. But to conform our language more to common use, we ought to divide arguments into demonstrations, proofs, and probabilities—by ‘proofs’ meaning arguments from experience that leave no room for doubt or opposition." And,

I believe the most general and most popular explication of this matter, is to say [See Mr. Locke, chapter of power.], that finding from experience, that there are several new productions in matter, such as the motions and variations of body, and concluding that there must somewhere be a power capable of producing them, we arrive at last by this reasoning at the idea of power and efficacy. But to be convinced that this explication is more popular than philosophical, we need but reflect on two very obvious principles. First, That reason alone can never give rise to any original idea, and secondly, that reason, as distinguished from experience, can never make us conclude, that a cause or productive quality is absolutely requisite to every beginning of existence. Both these considerations have been sufficiently explained: and therefore shall not at present be any farther insisted on.

— Hume, Section XIV, "Of the idea of necessary connexion", in A Treatise of Human Nature

Hume divided all of human knowledge into two categories: matters of fact and relations of ideas (see also Kant's analytic-synthetic distinction). Mathematical and logical propositions (e.g. "that the square of the hypotenuse is equal to the sum of the squares of the two sides") are examples of the first, while propositions involving some contingent observation of the world (e.g. "the sun rises in the East") are examples of the second. All of people's "ideas", in turn, are derived from their "impressions". For Hume, an "impression" corresponds roughly with what we call a sensation. To remember or to imagine such impressions is to have an "idea". Ideas are therefore the faint copies of sensations.

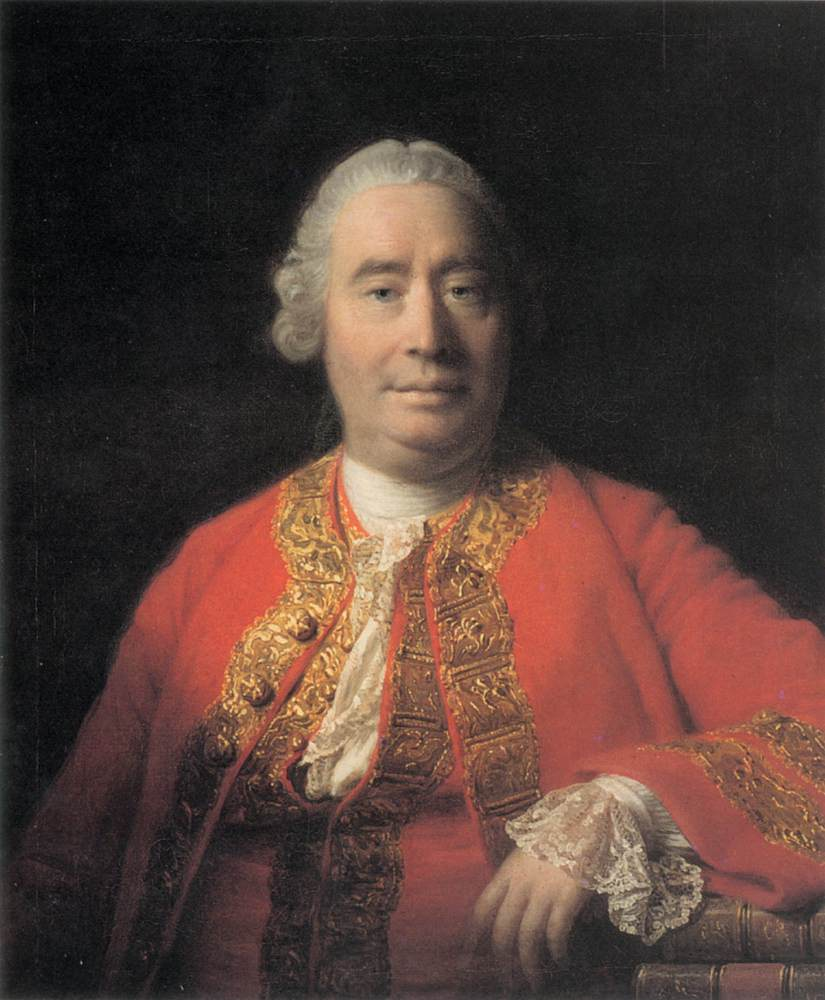
David Hume's empiricism led to numerous philosophical schools.

Hume maintained that no knowledge, even the most basic beliefs about the natural world, can be conclusively established by reason. Rather, he maintained, our beliefs are more a result of accumulated habits, developed in response to accumulated sense experiences. Among his many arguments Hume also added another important slant to the debate about scientific method—that of the problem of induction. Hume argued that it requires inductive reasoning to arrive at the premises for the principle of inductive reasoning, and therefore the justification for inductive reasoning is a circular argument. Among Hume's conclusions regarding the problem of induction is that there is no certainty that the future will resemble the past. Thus, as a simple instance posed by Hume, we cannot know with certainty by inductive reasoning that the sun will continue to rise in the East, but instead come to expect it to do so because it has repeatedly done so in the past.

Hume concluded that such things as belief in an external world and belief in the existence of the self were not rationally justifiable. According to Hume these beliefs were to be accepted nonetheless because of their profound basis in instinct and custom. Hume's lasting legacy, however, was the doubt that his skeptical arguments cast on the legitimacy of inductive reasoning, allowing many skeptics who followed to cast similar doubt.

=== Phenomenalism ===
Most of Hume's followers have disagreed with his conclusion that belief in an external world is rationally unjustifiable, contending that Hume's own principles implicitly contained the rational justification for such a belief, that is, beyond being content to let the issue rest on human instinct, custom and habit. According to an extreme empiricist theory known as phenomenalism, anticipated by the arguments of both Hume and George Berkeley, a physical object is a kind of construction out of our experiences.

Phenomenalism is the view that physical objects, properties, events (whatever is physical) are reducible to mental objects, properties, events. Ultimately, only mental objects, properties, events, exist—hence the closely related term subjective idealism. By the phenomenalistic line of thinking, to have a visual experience of a real physical thing is to have an experience of a certain kind of group of experiences. This type of set of experiences possesses a constancy and coherence that is lacking in the set of experiences of which hallucinations, for example, are a part. As John Stuart Mill put it in the mid-19th century, matter is the "permanent possibility of sensation". Mill's empiricism went a significant step beyond Hume in still another respect: in maintaining that induction is necessary for all meaningful knowledge including mathematics. As summarized by D.W. Hamlin:

[Mill] claimed that mathematical truths were merely very highly confirmed generalizations from experience; mathematical inference, generally conceived as deductive [and a priori] in nature, Mill set down as founded on induction. Thus, in Mill's philosophy there was no real place for knowledge based on relations of ideas. In his view logical and mathematical necessity is psychological; we are merely unable to conceive any other possibilities than those that logical and mathematical propositions assert. This is perhaps the most extreme version of empiricism known, but it has not found many defenders.

Mill's empiricism thus held that knowledge of any kind is not from direct experience but an inductive inference from direct experience. The problems other philosophers have had with Mill's position center around the following issues: Firstly, Mill's formulation encounters difficulty when it describes what direct experience is by differentiating only between actual and possible sensations. This misses some key discussion concerning conditions under which such "groups of permanent possibilities of sensation" might exist in the first place. Berkeley put God in that gap; the phenomenalists, including Mill, essentially left the question unanswered.

In the end, lacking an acknowledgement of an aspect of "reality" that goes beyond mere "possibilities of sensation", such a position leads to a version of subjective idealism. Questions of how floor beams continue to support a floor while unobserved, how trees continue to grow while unobserved and untouched by human hands, etc., remain unanswered, and perhaps unanswerable in these terms. Secondly, Mill's formulation leaves open the unsettling possibility that the "gap-filling entities are purely possibilities and not actualities at all". Thirdly, Mill's position, by calling mathematics merely another species of inductive inference, misapprehends mathematics. It fails to fully consider the structure and method of mathematical science, the products of which are arrived at through an internally consistent deductive set of procedures which do not, either today or at the time Mill wrote, fall under the agreed meaning of induction.

The phenomenalist phase of post-Humean empiricism ended by the 1940s, for by that time it had become obvious that statements about physical things could not be translated into statements about actual and possible sense data. If a physical object statement is to be translatable into a sense-data statement, the former must be at least deducible from the latter. But it came to be realized that there is no finite set of statements about actual and possible sense-data from which we can deduce even a single physical-object statement. The translating or paraphrasing statement must be couched in terms of normal observers in normal conditions of observation.

There is, however, no finite set of statements that are couched in purely sensory terms and can express the satisfaction of the condition of the presence of a normal observer. According to phenomenalism, to say that a normal observer is present is to make the hypothetical statement that were a doctor to inspect the observer, the observer would appear to the doctor to be normal. But, of course, the doctor himself must be a normal observer. If we are to specify this doctor's normality in sensory terms, we must make reference to a second doctor who, when inspecting the sense organs of the first doctor, would himself have to have the sense data a normal observer has when inspecting the sense organs of a subject who is a normal observer. And if we are to specify in sensory terms that the second doctor is a normal observer, we must refer to a third doctor, and so on (also see the third man).

=== Logical empiricism ===
Logical empiricism (also logical positivism or neopositivism) was an early 20th-century attempt to synthesize the essential ideas of British empiricism (e.g. a strong emphasis on sensory experience as the basis for knowledge) with certain insights from mathematical logic that had been developed by Gottlob Frege and Ludwig Wittgenstein. Some of the key figures in this movement were Otto Neurath, Moritz Schlick and the rest of the Vienna Circle, along with A. J. Ayer, Rudolf Carnap and Hans Reichenbach.

The neopositivists subscribed to a notion of philosophy as the conceptual clarification of the methods, insights and discoveries of the sciences. They saw in the logical symbolism elaborated by Frege (1848–1925) and Bertrand Russell (1872–1970) a powerful instrument that could rationally reconstruct all scientific discourse into an ideal, logically perfect, language that would be free of the ambiguities and deformations of natural language. This gave rise to what they saw as metaphysical pseudoproblems and other conceptual confusions. By combining Frege's thesis that all mathematical truths are logical with the early Wittgenstein's idea that all logical truths are mere linguistic tautologies, they arrived at a twofold classification of all propositions: the "analytic" (a priori) and the "synthetic" (a posteriori). On this basis, they formulated a strong principle of demarcation between sentences that have sense and those that do not: the so-called "verification principle". Any sentence that is not purely logical, or is unverifiable, is devoid of meaning. As a result, most metaphysical, ethical, aesthetic and other traditional philosophical problems came to be considered pseudoproblems.

In the extreme empiricism of the neopositivists—at least before the 1930s—any genuinely synthetic assertion must be reducible to an ultimate assertion (or set of ultimate assertions) that expresses direct observations or perceptions. In later years, Carnap and Neurath abandoned this sort of phenomenalism in favor of a rational reconstruction of knowledge into the language of an objective spatio-temporal physics. That is, instead of translating sentences about physical objects into sense-data, such sentences were to be translated into so-called protocol sentences, for example, "X at location Y and at time T observes such and such". The central theses of logical positivism (verificationism, the analytic–synthetic distinction, reductionism, etc.) came under sharp attack after World War II by thinkers such as Nelson Goodman, W. V. Quine, Hilary Putnam, Karl Popper, and Richard Rorty. By the late 1960s, it had become evident to most philosophers that the movement had pretty much run its course, though its influence is still significant among contemporary analytic philosophers such as Michael Dummett and other anti-realists.

=== Pragmatism ===
In the late 19th and early 20th century, several forms of pragmatic philosophy arose. The ideas of pragmatism, in its various forms, developed mainly from discussions between Charles Sanders Peirce and William James when both men were at Harvard in the 1870s. James popularized the term "pragmatism", giving Peirce full credit for its patrimony, but Peirce later demurred from the tangents that the movement was taking, and redubbed what he regarded as the original idea with the name of "pragmaticism". Along with its pragmatic theory of truth, this perspective integrates the basic insights of empirical (experience-based) and rational (concept-based) thinking.

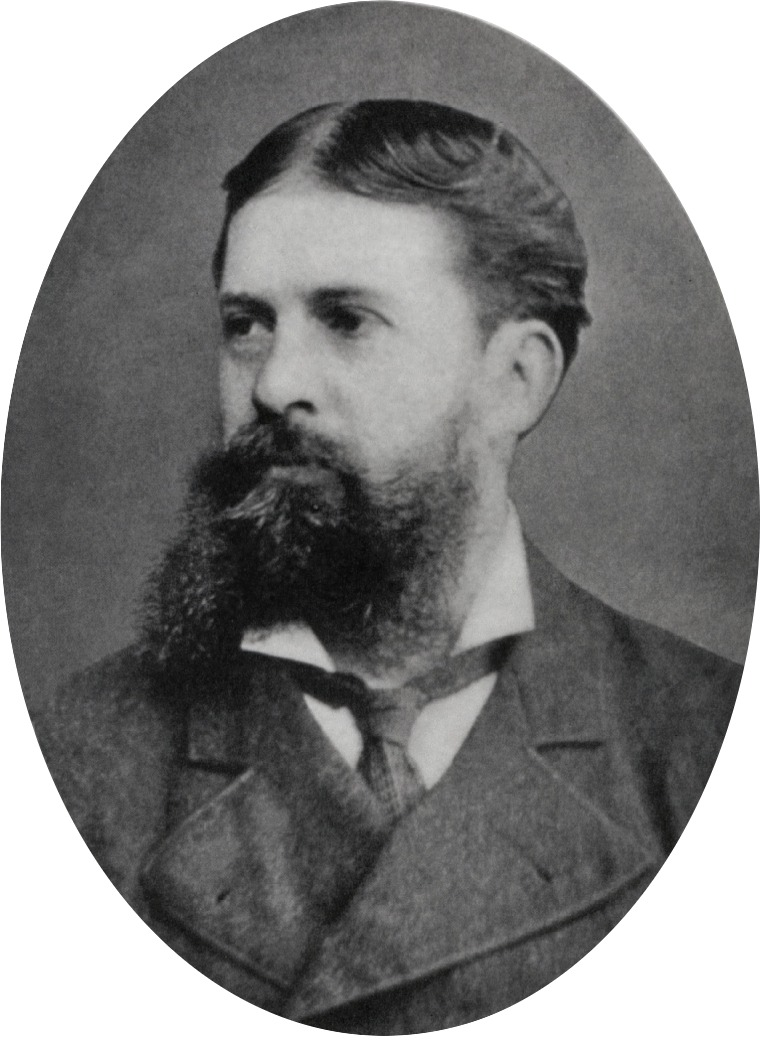
Charles Sanders Peirce

Charles Peirce (1839–1914) was highly influential in laying the groundwork for today's empirical scientific method. Although Peirce severely criticized many elements of Descartes' peculiar brand of rationalism, he did not reject rationalism outright. Indeed, he concurred with the main ideas of rationalism, most importantly the idea that rational concepts can be meaningful and the idea that rational concepts necessarily go beyond the data given by empirical observation. In later years he even emphasized the concept-driven side of the then ongoing debate between strict empiricism and strict rationalism, in part to counterbalance the excesses to which some of his cohorts had taken pragmatism under the "data-driven" strict-empiricist view.

Among Peirce's major contributions was to place inductive reasoning and deductive reasoning in a complementary rather than competitive mode, the latter of which had been the primary trend among the educated since David Hume wrote a century before. To this, Peirce added the concept of abductive reasoning. The combined three forms of reasoning serve as a primary conceptual foundation for the empirically based scientific method today. Peirce's approach "presupposes that (1) the objects of knowledge are real things, (2) the characters (properties) of real things do not depend on our perceptions of them, and (3) everyone who has sufficient experience of real things will agree on the truth about them. According to Peirce's doctrine of fallibilism, the conclusions of science are always tentative. The rationality of the scientific method does not depend on the certainty of its conclusions, but on its self-corrective character: by continued application of the method science can detect and correct its own mistakes, and thus eventually lead to the discovery of truth".

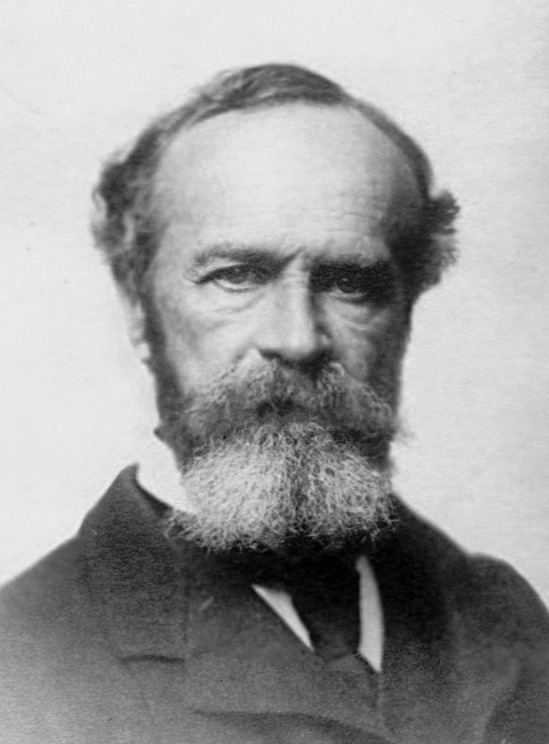
William James

In his Harvard "Lectures on Pragmatism" (1903), Peirce enumerated what he called the "three cotary propositions of pragmatism" (L: cos, cotis whetstone), saying that they "put the edge on the maxim of pragmatism". First among these, he listed the peripatetic-thomist observation mentioned above, but he further observed that this link between sensory perception and intellectual conception is a two-way street. That is, it can be taken to say that whatever we find in the intellect is also incipiently in the senses. Hence, if theories are theory-laden then so are the senses, and perception itself can be seen as a species of abductive inference, its difference being that it is beyond control and hence beyond critique—in a word, incorrigible. This in no way conflicts with the fallibility and revisability of scientific concepts, since it is only the immediate percept in its unique individuality or "thisness"—what the Scholastics called its haecceity—that stands beyond control and correction. Scientific concepts, on the other hand, are general in nature, and transient sensations do in another sense find correction within them. This notion of perception as abduction has received periodic revivals in artificial intelligence and cognitive science research, most recently for instance with the work of Irvin Rock on indirect perception.

Around the beginning of the 20th century, William James (1842–1910) coined the term "radical empiricism" to describe an offshoot of his form of pragmatism, which he argued could be dealt with separately from his pragmatism—though in fact the two concepts are intertwined in James's published lectures. James maintained that the empirically observed "directly apprehended universe needs ... no extraneous trans-empirical connective support", by which he meant to rule out the perception that there can be any value added by seeking supernatural explanations for natural phenomena. James' "radical empiricism" is thus not radical in the context of the term "empiricism", but is instead fairly consistent with the modern use of the term "empirical". His method of argument in arriving at this view, however, still readily encounters debate within philosophy even today.

John Dewey (1859–1952) modified James' pragmatism to form a theory known as instrumentalism. The role of sense experience in Dewey's theory is crucial, in that he saw experience as a unified totality of things through which everything else is interrelated. Dewey's basic thought, in accordance with empiricism, was that reality is determined by past experience. Therefore, humans adapt their past experiences of things to perform experiments upon and test the pragmatic values of such experience. The value of such experience is measured experientially and scientifically, and the results of such tests generate ideas that serve as instruments for future experimentation, in physical sciences as in ethics. Thus, ideas in Dewey's system retain their empiricist flavour in that they are only known a posteriori.

== Empiricism in contemporary philosophy of mind and cognitive science ==
While empiricism has traditionally been an epistemological doctrine concerned with the sources and limits of human knowledge, it has also taken on a psychological dimension in contemporary philosophy of mind and cognitive science, where it stands in contrast with nativism (or rationalism) over the nature and origins of mental representations, concepts, and cognitive capacities. Contemporary empiricists hold that the mind's innate endowment is limited to relatively simple and general-purpose learning mechanisms and that the rich cognitive capacities humans display — including language acquisition, conceptual thought, and social cognition — can be explained without positing substantive innate mental content. Nativists (or rationalists), by contrast, argue that innate mental representations and specialized psychological mechanisms play a foundational role in explaining how the human mind acquires its knowledge and diverse cognitive capacities.

== See also ==
- Abstract empiricism – 1959 book by C. Wright Mills
- Constructive empiricism – Form of empiricism in philosophy of science
- Empirical idealism
- Empirical realism
- Empirical relationship – Relationship inferred from observation
- Empirical research – Scientific inquiry based on observation or experimental procedure
- Empirical sociology
- Feminist empiricism – Perspective within feminist research
- Ground truth – Information provided by direct observation
- History of scientific method
- Inquiry – Type of investigation
- Kantian empiricism
- Natural philosophy – Philosophical study of nature
- Naturalism – Belief that only natural laws and forces operate in the universe
- Objectivity – Basic distinction in philosophy
- Phenomenology – Philosophical method and schools of philosophy
- Positivism – Empiricist philosophical theory
- Psychological nativism – View in psychology about the brain
- Quasi-empirical method
- Reformed empiricism
- Sensualism – Epistemological position
- Transcendental empiricism
