= Martin Nakata =

Australian academic

Martin Nakata AM is an Australian academic, researcher and scholar in the field of Indigenous education, knowledge, and studies. He is the first Aboriginal/Indigenous person from the Torres Strait Islands to obtain a doctoral degree. He is also a proponent of Indigenous standpoint theory. As of 2021, he is Deputy Vice-Chancellor of James Cook University. In 2020 he was conferred with Member of the Order of Australia for "significant service to tertiary education, and to learning outcomes for Indigenous students". An asteroid in the Koronis family has been named in his honour as 7547 Martinnakata for his contribution to Indigenous astronomy.

== Early life and education ==
Nakata is of Torres Strait islander and Japanese descent. His mother is a traditional owner of islands in the Torres Strait, a remote region of Australia. His dad was born in Kushimoto-cho, Wakayama-Ken, Japan. Prof Nakata grew up in the islands where he did all his schooling years and has a thorough and intimate understanding of the languages and customs of the Torres Strait Islander people. He was trained as a teacher and in 1991 graduated with a Bachelor of Education with first class honours, and in 1998 he graduated with a PhD degree in education from James Cook University, and thereafter specialised in the field of Indigenous education.

== Professional career ==
Nakata is recognised nationally and internationally as one of the leading Indigenous academics in Australia. He has had an extensive academic research career in the fields of Indigenous education, Indigenous Studies and Indigenous Knowledge. His current research work includes two longitudinal projects on the academic preparation of Indigenous students for university studies, and the academic performance of Indigenous school students in the Math and Science curriculum. He is a Chief Investigator on the ARC Centre of Excellence for Australian Biodiversity and Heritage, and leading the Indigenous STEM project to examine under-explored aspects of learning which can improve educational performance of Indigenous students in Australia. He has presented over seventy plenary and keynote addresses at professional conferences in Iceland, Norway, Scotland, Greece, South Africa, Papua New Guinea, Philippines, Thailand, Malaysia, Taiwan, South Korea, Japan, Canada, United States, Peru, Aotearoa (NZ) and Australia, and has published extensively on Australian Indigenous education issues in national and international academic journals, anthologies and books. He has been the co-editor of the Australian Journal of Indigenous Education for the past ten years, and he continues to serve on editorial boards of academic journals in several countries.

== List of selected works ==
=== Books ===
- Nakata, Martin (2007). Disciplining the Savages and Savaging the Disciplines. Sydney: Aboriginal Studies Press. ISBN 978-0-85575-548-5.
- Nakata, Martin (2001). Indigenous People, Racism and the United Nations. Sydney: South Pacific Books. ISBN 978-1-86335-069-3.
- Nakata, Martin; Day, Andrew (2008). Anger and Indigenous Men. Alexandria, NSW: Federation Press. ISBN 978-1-86287-685-9.
- Nakata, Martin; Harris, Michelle (2013). The Politics of Identity - Emerging Indigeneity. Sydney: Sydney University Press. ISBN 978-0-9872369-2-0.

=== Journal articles ===
- Nakata, M.; Nakata, V. (2019). "Indigenous Undergraduates' Use of Supplementary Tutors". Australian Journal of Indigenous Education. 48 (2): 119–128. doi:10.1017/jie.2017.39.
- Nakata, M. (2018). "Difficult Dialogues in the South : Questions about Practice". Australian Journal of Indigenous Education. 47 (1): 1–7. doi:10.1017/jie.2017.22.
- Nakata, M.; Nakata, V.; Martin, G. (2015). "Promoting Persistence of Indigenous Students through Cultural Interface". Studies in Higher Education. 42 (7): 1–16.
- Nakata, M. (2013). "The Rights and Blights of Politics in Indigenous Higher Education". Anthropological Forum. 23 (3): 289–313. doi:10.1080/00664677.2013.803457.
- Nakata, M.; Nakata, V. (2004). "Approaches to Academic Preparation and Support for Indigenous Studies". Australian Journal of Indigenous Education. 37 (1): 137–145. doi:10.1375/S1326011100000478.
- Nakata, M. (2006). "Australian Indigenous Studies: A Question of Discipline". The Australian Journal of Anthropology. 17 (3) doi:10.1111/j.1835-9310.2006.tb00063.x
- Nakata, M. (2002). "Indigenous Knowledge and Cultural Interface". IFLA Journal. 28 (5–6): 281–291. doi:10.1177/034003520202800513.
- Nakata, M. (1995). Culture in education: A political strategy for us or for them? Ngoonjook, (11), 40–61. https://search.informit.org/doi/10.3316/informit.032591622745468

=== Edited works ===
- Nakata, Martin; Langton, Marcia, eds. (2005), Australian Indigenous Knowledge and Libraries, 1 (1st ed.), Sydney: UTS Press, ISBN 978-0-9802840-1-0.

== See also ==
- Standpoint Theory
- Indigenous Studies
