= Sandra Harding =

American philosopher (1935–2025)

Sandra G. Harding
- Born: March 29, 1935
- Died: March 5, 2025 (aged 89)

Philosophical work
- Era: 20th-century philosophy
- Region: Western philosophy
- School: Feminist philosophy, post-colonialism
- Main interests: Epistemology, philosophy of science, standpoint theory
- Notable ideas: Strong objectivity, feminist epistemology

Sandra G. Harding (March 29, 1935 – March 5, 2025) was an American philosopher of feminist and postcolonial theory, epistemology, research methodology, and philosophy of science, who directed the UCLA Center for the Study of Women from 1996 to 2000, and co-edited Signs: Journal of Women in Culture and Society from 2000 to 2005. Until her death, she was a Distinguished Professor Emeritus of Education and Gender Studies at UCLA and a Distinguished Affiliate Professor of Philosophy at Michigan State University. In 2013, she was awarded the John Desmond Bernal Prize by the Society for the Social Studies of Science (4S).

== Education and career ==
Sandra Harding received her undergraduate degree from Douglass College of Rutgers University in 1956. After 12 years working as a legal researcher, editor, and fifth-grade math teacher in New York City and Poughkeepsie, New York, she returned to graduate school and earned a doctorate from the Department of Philosophy at NYU in 1973.

Harding's first university teaching job was at The Allen Center of the State University of New York at Albany, an experimental critical social sciences college which was "defunded" by the state of New York in 1976. She then joined the Department of Philosophy at the University of Delaware, with a joint appointment to the Women's Studies Program. She was promoted to Associate Professor in 1979, and to full Professor in 1986. From 1981 until she left Delaware in 1996, she held a Joint Appointment to the Department of Sociology. She was Director of the Women's Studies Program at Delaware from 1985 to 1991 and from 1992 to 1993.

From 1994 to 1996, she was Adjunct Professor of Philosophy and Women's Studies at UCLA on a half-time basis. In 1996, she was appointed Director of the UCLA Center for the Study of Women, a research institute, a position she held until 2000. From 1996, she was also a Professor in the Graduate Department of Education and the Department of Gender Studies at UCLA. In 2012, she was appointed Distinguished Professor of Education and Gender Studies. From 2000 to 2005, she also was co-editor of Signs: Journal of Women in Culture and Society.

Harding held Visiting Professor appointments at the University of Amsterdam (1987), University of Costa Rica (1990), the Swiss Federal Institute of Technology Zurich (ETH) (1993), and the Asian Institute of Technology, Bangkok (1994). In 2011 she was appointed a Distinguished Affiliate Professor in the Department of Philosophy at Michigan State University, East Lansing.

She was a consultant to several United Nations organizations including the U.N. Commission on Science and Technology for Development, the Pan American Health Organization, UNESCO, and the U.N. Development Fund for Women. She was invited to co-edit a chapter of UNESCO's World Science Report 1996 on "The Gender Dimension of Science and Technology". This 56-page account was the first such attempt to address gender issues in science and technology in a global context. She was invited to contribute a chapter to UNESCO's World Social Science Report 2010 on "Standpoint Methodologies and Epistemologies: a Logic of Scientific Inquiry for People."

Harding served on the editorial boards of numerous journals in the fields of philosophy, women's studies, science studies, social research methodology, and African philosophy. Phi Beta Kappa selected her as a national lecturer in 2007. She lectured at more than 300 colleges, universities, and conferences in North America as well as in Central America, Europe, Africa and Asia. Her books, essays and book chapters have been translated into dozens of languages and reprinted in hundreds of anthologies.

== Research and criticism ==
Harding developed the research standard of "strong objectivity," and contributed to the articulation of standpoint methodology. This kind of research process starts off from questions that arise in the daily lives of people in oppressed groups. To answer such questions, it "studies up", examining the principles, practices and cultures of dominant institutions, from the design and management of which oppressed groups have been excluded. She has also contributed to the development of feminist, anti-racist, multicultural, and postcolonial studies of the natural and social sciences, asking the extent to which paradigms like feminist empiricism are useful for promoting to goals of feminist inquiry. She was the author or editor of many books and essays on these topics and was one of the founders of the field of feminist epistemology. This work had been influential in the social sciences and in women/gender studies across the disciplines. It has helped to create new kinds of discussions about how best to relink scientific research to pro-democratic goals.

In her 1986 book The Science Question in Feminism, Harding touched on the pervasiveness of rape and torture metaphors for the scientific method in the writings of Francis Bacon and others. In the book, she questioned why it would not be as illuminating and honest to refer to Newton's laws as "Newton's rape manual" rather than "Newtonian mechanics". Harding later said she regretted the statement. This statement, among others, caused Harding's work to be controversial within certain scholarly circles. During the Science Wars, a 1990s debate regarding the value-neutrality of the sciences, her work became a main target of critics of feminist and sociological approaches.

She was criticized by mathematicians Michael Sullivan, Mary Gray, and Lenore Blum, and by the historian of science Ann Hibner Koblitz. Historian Garrett G. Fagan criticized her for uncritically endorsing Afrocentric pseudohistory. Her essay "Science is 'Good to Think With'" was the lead article in the issue of the journal Social Text that also included the Sokal Hoax, which focused on her work among others. Her work was also a main target of Paul Gross and Norman Levitt's Higher Superstition.

== Death ==
Harding died on March 5, 2025, at the age of 89.

== Awards, honors and fellowships ==
- 2013. Awarded John Desmond Bernal Prize of Society for the Social Studies of Science (4S).
- 2012. Appointed Distinguished Professor of Education and Gender Studies. UCLA
- 2011. Appointed Distinguished Affiliate Professor of Philosophy, Michigan State University, East Lansing
- 2009. Received American Education Research Association (AERA) Award for Distinguished Contributions to Gender Equity in Education Research.
- 2007–08. Appointed a Phi Beta Kappa National Lecturer.
- 2007. Awarded The Douglass (College) Society Membership.
- 2000–05 Co-editor of Signs: Journal of Women in Culture and Society.
- 1990 Woman Philosopher of the Year, Eastern Division Society for Women in Philosophy.
- 1989. Elected to membership in Sigma Xi.

== Selected works ==
=== Books ===
- The Science Question in Feminism, 1986.
- Whose Science? Whose Knowledge?: Thinking from Women's Lives, 1991.
- Is Science Multicultural? Postcolonialisms, Feminisms, and Epistemologies, 1998.
- Science and Social Inequality: Feminist and Postcolonial Issues, 2006.
- Sciences From Below: Feminisms, Postcolonialities, and Modernities, 2008.
- Objectivity and Diversity: Another Logic of Scientific Research, 2015.

=== Articles ===
- 1973. "Feminism: Reform or Revolution?" Philosophical Forum (Boston) 5, 271–284
- 1979. "The Social Function of the Empiricist Conception of Mind," Metaphilosophy 10 (Jan 1), 38–47
- 1979. "Is the Equality of Opportunity Principle Democratic?" Philosophical Forum (Boston) 10 (Dec 1), 206–22
- 1982. "Is Gender a Variable in Conceptions of Rationality: A Survey of Issues," Dialectica, 36 (Jan 1): 225–42
- 1983. "Why Has the Sex/Gender System Become Visible Only Now," in Discovering Reality, ed. Sandra Harding and Merrill Hintikka
- 1987. "The Method Question," Hypatia: A Journal of Feminist Philosophy 2, 19–35
- 1987. "The Curious Coincidence of Feminine and African Moralities," Women and Moral Theory, ed. Eva Feder Kittay and Diana Meyers
- 1990. "Starting Thought From Women's Lives: Eight Resources for Maximizing Objectivity," Journal of Social Philosophy 21(2–3), 140–49
- 1990. "Feminism, Science, and the Anti-Enlightenment Critiques," in Feminism/Postmodernism, ed. Linda Nicholson, 83–106
- 1992. "After Eurocentrism? Challenges for the Philosophy of Science," PSA 1992 Vol. 2, 311–319
- 1993. "Rethinking Standpoint Epistemology: What Is 'Strong Objectivity'?" in Feminist Epistemologies, ed. Linda Alcoff and Elizabeth Potter
- 1995. "'Strong Objectivity': A Response to the New Objectivity Question," Synthese, Vol. 104, No. 3, pp. 331–349
- 1998. "Women, Science, and Society," Science, New Series, Vol. 281, No. 5383 (Sep 11 1998), 1599–1600
- 2002. "Must the Advance of Science Advance Global Inequality?" International Studies Review, Vol. 4, No. 2 (Summer), 87–105
- 2003. "How Standpoint Methodology Informs Philosophy of Social Science," in Blackwell Guide to the Philosophy of the Social Sciences
- 2004. "A Socially Relevant Philosophy of Science? Resources from Standpoint Theory's Controversiality," Hypatia, Vol. 19, No. 1, 25–47
- 2005. "'Science and Democracy:' Replayed or Redesigned?" Social Epistemology, Vol. 19, No. 1, 5–18
- 2006. "Two Influential Theories of Ignorance and Philosophy's Interests in Ignoring Them," Hypatia, Vol. 21, No. 3 (Summer), 20–36
- 2007. "Modernity, Science, and Democracy," in Social Philosophy Today, Volume 22. Philosophy Documentation Center
- 2008. "How Many Epistemologies Should Guide the Production of Scientific Knowledge?" Hypatia, Vol. 23, No. 4, 212–219
- 2009. "Postcolonial and Feminist Philosophies of Science and Technology," Postcolonial Studies, Vol. 12, No. 4, p. 410–429
- 2010. "Standpoint Methodologies and Epistemologies: A Logic of Scientific Inquiry for People," World Social Science Report 2010, 173–5
- 2012. "Objectivity and Diversity," in Encyclopedia of Diversity in Education, ed. James Banks
- 2017. "Latin American Decolonial Studies: Feminist Issues," Feminist Studies, Vol. 43, No. 3, 624–636
- and Kathryn Norberg, 2005. "New Feminist Approaches to Social Science Methodologies: An Introduction," Signs, Vol. 30, No. 4, 2009–15

== See also ==
- American philosophy
- List of American philosophers
- Standpoint theory
- Standpoint feminism
