= Lorraine Code =

Philosopher

- Born: October 19, 1937 (age 88)

Academic background
- Education: Queen's University (B.A.); University of Guelph (Ph.D., 1978)
- Thesis: Knowledge and subjectivity (1978)

Academic work
- Discipline: Philosophy
- Institutions: York University
- Main interests: feminist epistemology and the politics of knowledge

Lorraine Code FRSC (born October 19, 1937) is a Canadian philosopher. She is Professor Emerita of Philosophy at York University in Toronto, Ontario, Canada and a Fellow of the Royal Society of Canada. Her principal area of research is feminist epistemology and the politics of knowledge.

== Career ==
She earned her Bachelor of Arts (BA) at Queen's University and her PhD at the University of Guelph in 1978. After finishing her BA at Queen's in the 1950s, Code travelled to Germany on an exchange fellowship. She then spent the following years teaching in the United Kingdom before returning to Canada for graduate school.

In 1987, Code was appointed a Canada Research Fellow at York University, and was later promoted to the title of Professor in the Department of Philosophy.

In 2006, she published "Ecological Thinking: The Politics of Epistemic Location."

== Awards and honours ==
In 1997, Code was awarded the Walter Gordon Fellowship for her research in feminist theory and was named a Distinguished Research Professor. Three years later, Code was awarded a Killam Research Fellowship, named after Dorothy J. Killam, which allowed her to conduct full-time research.

In 2005, Code was elected a Fellow of the Royal Society of Canada for her work in epistemology. She was also given an honorary doctorate from University of Guelph.

In 2009, she was awarded the Distinguished Woman Philosopher of the Year from the American Society for Women in Philosophy.

In 2013, Code was awarded the Queen Elizabeth II Diamond Jubilee Medal.

In 2016, Code was awarded the Ursula Franklin Award in Gender Studies by the Royal Society of Canada. The following year, York University recognized her as a research leader in the Faculty of Liberal Arts and Professional Studies.

== Publications ==
The following is a list of publications:

- Encyclopedia of feminist theories. Routledge, 2006.
- Ecological Thinking: The Politics of Epistemic Location. Oxford University Press, 2006. ISBN 0-19-515943-8.
- Feminist interpretations of Hans-Georg Gadamer. Pennsylvania University Press, 2003. ISBN 978-0-271-02244-4.
- Rhetorical Spaces: Essays on (Gendered) Locations. Routledge, 1995. ISBN 978-0-415-90936-5.
- What Can She Know? Feminist Theory and the Construction of Knowledge. Cornell University Press, 1991.
- Epistemic Responsibility. Brown University Press, 1987.
