= Susan Bordo =

American philosopher

- Born: 1947 (age 78–79); Newark, New Jersey, U.S.
- Education: State University of New York at Stony Brook (Ph.D., 1982)
- Occupations: Author; philosopher; professor
- Employer: University of Kentucky

Susan Bordo (born 1947) is an American philosopher. Her work focuses on contemporary cultural studies, with a particular focus on feminist theory. Her scholarship focuses on the intersection of culture and the body, including topics such as eating disorders (including anorexia nervosa and bulimia nervosa), plastic surgery, ideals of beauty, racism, masculinity, and sexual harassment.

== Overview ==
Bordo's work contributes to feminist, cultural, and gender studies. Her scholarship focuses on the connections between consumer culture and the construction of gendered bodies. Her 1993 book Unbearable Weight: Feminism, Western Culture, and the Body examined how popular culture shapes perceptions of the female body. It also discusses conditions like hysteria, agoraphobia, anorexia nervosa, and bulimia as "complex crystallizations of culture."

Bordo's 1999 book The Male Body: A New Look at Men in Public and Private examined cultural and personal perspectives on the male body from a woman's perspective.

== Education and career ==
Bordo was raised in Newark, New Jersey and graduated from Weequahic High School in 1964. She received her Ph.D. from Stony Brook University in 1982. Bordo is the Otis A. Singletary Chair in the Humanities at the University of Kentucky, where she teaches English and women's studies.

== Theoretical context ==
=== Philosophical discourse ===
Bordo has written for both academic and general audiences while remaining rooted in theoretical frameworks. Her work draws on philosophical discourse to examine issues such as rationality, objectivity, and mind–body dualism, and considers the body within historical and cultural contexts. Bordo argues that throughout history, the body has been constructed as separate from the "true self"—variously conceived as soul, mind, spirit, will, creativity, or freedom—and as an entity that undermines the efforts of that self. In developing her argument, she traces the concept of the body to writers such as Plato, Augustine of Hippo, and authors of the Bible, who Bordo claims have portrayed the body as animalistic, appetitive, deceptive, and a prison for the soul.

Bordo has examined the dualistic nature of the mind-body relationship through the philosophies of Aristotle, Georg Wilhelm Friedrich Hegel, and René Descartes. She has analyzed how binaries such as spirit/matter and male activity/female passivity have historically reinforced gender roles and categorizations. According to Bordo, these dualisms have positioned men as aligned with intellect and the mind or spirit, while women have been associated with the body, often the subordinate and negatively connoted term in this dichotomy.

=== Materialism ===
Bordo argues that "knowledge is 'embodied,' produced from a 'standpoint,' by a body that exists as a material entity among other material entities." This view places her within a materialist framework, as Susan Hekman has noted, emphasizing Bordo's focus on the materiality of the body, often referred to as the "real" body. Bordo's work is frequently compared and contrasted to that of Judith Butler.

Bordo has compared to the body as a text to be inscribed upon and interpreted but emphasizes its material and situated nature within Western culture. In contrast, Butler aligns more with postmodern theory, treating the body as "pure text." Bordo has critiqued this approach, observing that treating the body as pure text highlights "subversive" and "destabilizing" elements while celebrating freedom and self-determination but may overlook the material aspects of the body. Bordo has argued that cultural definitions of the body and its materiality must be resisted and insists that "real" bodies remain central to feminist analysis and resistance.

=== Feminism ===
Bordo's critique of gendered, particularly feminine, bodies incorporates methodologies from feminist and gender studies. She has re-examined and modified other feminist approaches, including those that focused on dichotomies like oppressor/oppressed and victimizer/victim. Bordo has noted that second-wave feminism often regarded "the female body [as] a socially shaped and historically 'colonized' territory," a perspective that, she argues, framed women and their bodies primarily as passive victims within a patriarchal society. Bordo has highlighted newer feminist critiques that focus on "racial, economic and class differences among women" and examine both women's participation in patriarchal culture and their efforts to resist it.

=== Cultural studies ===
Situated within feminist and gender studies frameworks, Bordo's theories also draw from cultural studies, analyzing the influence of mass media as tools of domination and resistance. While some cultural theorists, such as John Fiske in Television Culture (1990), view media as shaping perception through representational codes while also offering opportunities for resistance through audience reinterpretation, Bordo has taken a more critical stance. She has argued that cultural codes function as pervasive and constraining forces. According to Bordo, "the rules of femininity have come to be culturally transmitted more and more through the deployment of standardized visual images," with mass media insidiously imposing ideals of bodily beauty that are perceived by those affected as freely chosen options.

=== Post-structuralism ===
Bordo's work on culture, power, and gender formation is influenced in part by post-structuralist. Susan Hekman notes that Bordo, like many contemporary feminist theorists, advocates for a selective application of postmodern theories. Bordo’s works use Michel Foucault's frameworks to critique and analyze "the normative feminine practices of our culture."

Bordo has written in favor of Foucault's conceptualization of power as a network of decentralized forces for understanding the formation and regulation of gender. In this framework, power operates from below, meaning that societal norms, including gender, are maintained less through coercion and more through self-surveillance and self-regulation. Bordo, like Foucault, has focused on the societal discourses that produce, define, and interpret the female body.

== Writing ==
=== The Flight to Objectivity: Essays on Cartesianism and Culture (1987) ===
Bordo has described The Flight to Objectivity as a "fresh approach" to René Descartes's 1641 work Meditations on First Philosophy. In The Flight to Objectivity, Bordo critiqued the stable notions of objectivity and knowledge central to Cartesian thought, which she argued have become increasingly questioned in contemporary society. She highlighted the "limitations of science and the interested, even ideological nature of all human pursuits," asserting that such critiques are now unavoidable. Bordo proposed that Descartes’ arguments should be understood not as abstract or ahistorical but within the cultural context that shaped them.

Susan Hekman observes that while The Flight to Objectivity does not directly theorize the body, it identifies Descartes's work as foundational to cultural conceptions of the body, particularly the female body. Bordo examined the Cartesian dualism of mind and body, where the body is depicted as a "prison that the mind must escape to achieve knowledge." This framework informed Bordo's broader analyses of how cultural forces shape perceptions of the body, with particular attention to the female body.

=== Unbearable Weight: Feminism, Western Culture, and the Body (1993) ===
Bordo's Unbearable Weight is a collection of essays that examines the body's construction and positioning within Western society, offering what Bordo describes as "a cultural approach to the body." The book analyzes "obsessive body practices of contemporary culture," such as plastic surgery, extreme dieting, and rigorous physical training, framing them not as anomalies but as "logical (if extreme) manifestations of anxieties and fantasies fostered by our culture." Bordo argued that these practices illustrate how cultural representations homogenize ideals and how these homogenized images become normalized.

Unbearable Weight also explores the relationship between culture and disorders like anorexia nervosa and bulimia. Bordo contended that such disorders cannot be fully understood through medical or psychological perspectives alone but must be viewed as "complex crystallizations of culture." She argued that while these disorders may appear to resist dominant ideological constructs, they simultaneously reveal the damaging influence of cultural norms on the female body.

In 2003, the tenth-anniversary reissue of Unbearable Weight was nominated for a Pulitzer Prize. In this updated edition, Bordo further examined cultural representations of the female body through the lenses of patriarchy, contemporary feminism, and postindustrial capitalism.

=== Twilight Zones: The Hidden Life of Cultural Images from Plato to O.J. (1997) ===
Twilight Zones continued Bordo's exploration of cultural images and their pervasive influence on contemporary society. Bordo argued that the allegory of the cave was analogous to contemporary issues. She wrote, "[f]or us, bedazzlement by created images is no metaphor; it is the actual condition of our lives." Bordo critiqued consumer culture's portrayal of idealized bodies, suggesting these reconstructed images present false ideals that viewers internalize as standards for their own bodies and lives. She advocated for a renewed concept of "truth," emphasizing the importance of teaching future generations to critically evaluate and "see through the illusions and mystifications" of an image-dominated culture.

The book also examines the relationship between academic and non-academic institutions, addressing the tendency of academic thought to position itself as being "outside the cave of cultural mystification," elevated above mainstream culture. While not anti-academic, Bordo critiqued this detachment, advocating instead for theory that engages directly with everyday life. She described this goal as an effort to "bring theory down to earth."

=== The Male Body: A New Look at Men in Public and in Private (1999) ===
In The Male Body, Bordo broadened her focus from examining female and feminized bodies to exploring the male body from a female perspective. The book analyzed representations of the male body in mass media, highlighting that concerns about bodily form and beauty affect men. Bordo further examined societal attitudes toward the penis and queer culture in the twentieth century.

=== The Creation of Anne Boleyn (2014) ===
In The Creation of Anne Boleyn, Bordo examined the myths and misconceptions that have shaped Anne Boleyn's historical narrative. She aims to dismantle the "sedimented mythology turned into 'history' by decades of repetition" and presents Boleyn as an ambitious woman striving for power, free from the distorted imagery often associated with her appearance.

=== The Destruction of Hillary Clinton (2017) ===
In The Destruction of Hillary Clinton, Susan Bordo analyzed the factors contributing to Hillary Clinton's defeat in the 2016 U.S. presidential election.

== Bibliography ==
- Bordo, Susan. "The Body and the Reproduction of Femininity: A Feminist Appropriation of Foucault." Gender/Body/Knowledge: Feminist Reconstructions of Being and Knowing. Eds. Alison M. Jaggar and Susan R. Bordo. New Brunswick: Rutgers UP, 1989. 13-33.
- Bordo, Susan. The Flight to Objectivity: Essays on Cartesianism and Culture. Albany: State U of New York P, 1987.
- Bordo, Susan. The Male Body: A Look at Men in Public and in Private. New York: Farrar, Straus and Giroux, 1999.
- Bordo, Susan. Twilight Zones: The Hidden Life of Cultural Images from Plato to O.J. Berkeley: U of California P, 1997.
- Bordo, Susan. Unbearable Weight: Feminism, Western Culture, and the Body. Berkeley: U of California P, 1993.
- Bordo, Susan, ed. Feminist Interpretations of René Descartes. University Park, PA: Pennsylvania State UP, 1999.
- Hekman, Susan. Review of Unbearable Weight, by Susan Bordo, and Bodies That Matter, by Judith Butler. Hypatia 10.4 (Fall 1995).
- Hekman, Susan. "Material Bodies." Body and Flesh: A Philosophical Reader. Ed. Donn Welton. Malden, MA: Blackwell, 1998. 61-70.
- Jarvis, Christina. "Gendered Appetites: Feminisms, Dorothy Allison, and the Body." Women's Studies 29.6 (Dec. 2000). 763-92.
- Rooney, Ellen. "What Can the Matter Be?" American Literary History 8.4 (Winter 1996). 745-58.
- "Susan Bordo." The Norton Anthology of Theory and Criticism. Vincent B. Leitch, gen. ed. New York: Norton and Co., 2001. 2360-62
- Bordo, Susan The Creation of Anne Boleyn, A New Look at England's Most Notorious Queen. HMH 2013
- Bordo, Susan. The Destruction of Hillary Clinton. Melville House (April 4, 2017). ISBN 978-1612196633

== See also ==
- American philosophy
- Body culture studies
- List of American philosophers
