= Epistemic insight =

Educational construct

Epistemic insight is a leap of mind that takes place when a learner makes a connection or realisation about how knowledge works. The construct is chiefly used in educational contexts. It encompasses curiosity, critical thinking and understanding concerning the nature of knowledge. It is associated with research and articles that seek or discuss ways to advance student understanding of knowledge and the interdependencies of disciplines across subjects and in real world contexts.

== Definition ==
Epistemic insight has been defined as 'knowledge about knowledge and in particular, knowledge about disciplines and how they interact. Although sharing concepts with epistemology, epistemic insight is to epistemology what insight is to philosophy. The philosopher Bernard Lonergan describes insight as a mental leap commonly characterised as an ‘aha’ moment or epiphany. Thus, epistemology is broadly understood as a branch of philosophical study into the nature and limits of knowledge. In comparison, epistemic insight is a leap of mind that takes place when a learner makes a connection or realisation about how knowledge works that makes sense to them. In a robotics workshop teenagers explored the question of what it means for them to be alive. The researchers analysed students’ surveys and feedback and say that participating students became more knowledgeable about the nature of science and why some questions are more amenable to scientific inquiry than others. In this and other examples epistemic insight is the 'aha' moment that comes when students see how to apply epistemic knowledge to design a better real-world product or to clarify a complex 'wicked' real-world problem.

== The Epistemic Insight Initiative ==
The Epistemic Insight initiative encourages research and curriculum innovation in epistemic insight and promotes materials designed to support teachers, tutors and researchers working across multiple stages of education. The Initiative launched a collaboration between a consortium of higher education teaching institutions in England which included Canterbury Christ Church University and St Mary's University, Twickenham.

== Applications in education ==
Epistemic insight is in a family of terms that are associated with aims to equip students with attitudes, virtues and competencies that they will need as wise and compassionate citizens. Other more established members are scientific literacy, epistemic humility and critical thinking. The potential for entrenched subject compartmentalisation and teaching to the test to reduce students' capacities to be curious about how knowledge works in the real world and in the context of Big Questions is at the heart of pedagogies and reforms associated with epistemic insight. According to Billingsley and Fraser, the guest editors of a themed edition of Research in Science Education,

Adopting epistemic insight as a curriculum goal can potentially engage students’ intellectual curiosity, develop their interdisciplinary scholarly expertise and ability to find solutions to wicked problems which are rational and compassionate.

Tools for teaching epistemic insight include the Discipline Wheel, where a question is put into the centre of a circle and students consider how the question might be interpreted and investigated by a number of different disciplines. An article for BBC Teach by science educator Leigh Hoath gives ‘What is climate change’ as an example of a Big Question that can be unpacked through the lenses of a range of disciplines students study in school including science, history, geography and mathematics. Hoath explains that exploring climate change through the perspectives of different subjects using a Discipline Wheel helps students to appreciate that responsibility for responding is shared across many sectors in society. Potentially, a curriculum which engages with epistemic insight may also widen the pipeline from school to science and science-related careers. There is also an advisory curriculum framework for teachers which illustrates what gains in epistemic insight look like at different levels across the stages of education.

== Publications ==
A collection of papers on epistemic insight was published in 2017 by The Association for Science Education in a themed section of School Science Review called Epistemic Insight: The power and limitations of science. A further special edition of School Science Review on epistemic insight in December 2017 was called Science, Engineering and Big Questions. One article addresses how science and the history of art can work together to tell the story of a painting while another considers the characteristics of a biologist's view of life. A third edition of School Science Review with a theme of Epistemic Insight was published during the COVID-19 pandemic. Called The role and relevance of science in addressing global concerns. it included an article that discussed media reporting of science during the pandemic

Research articles discussing epistemic insight have reported surveys, interviews and pedagogies in schools and teacher education and other areas of higher education such as the classics.
