= Susan Hekman =

Professor of political science (born 1949)

- Born: February 28, 1949 (age 77); Grand Rapids, Michigan

Academic background
- Education: University of Washington

Academic work
- Institutions: University of Texas at Arlington
- Main interests: Postmodern feminism
- Notable ideas: Criticism of standpoint feminism

Susan Jean Hekman (born February 28, 1949), is a postmodern feminist and the professor of political science and director of the graduate humanities program at the University of Texas at Arlington (UTA). Hekman's research has been critical of standpoint feminist theory.

== Biography ==
Hekman was born in Grand Rapids, Michigan, in 1949. Hekman earned her Ph.D. from the University of Washington in Seattle. While Hekman stayed at NIAS, she completed the first chapter of her proposed book, Subject Matters: The Evolution of the Subject in Feminist Theory. Hekman stated that, "the book will be an analysis of the major contributions to the development of the subject in feminist theory from the mid-twentieth century to the present. The first chapter, an analysis of the path-breaking work of Simone de Beauvoir, defines the themes that will be pursued in subsequent chapter. After completing this chapter, I sketched out the outline of the entire book, mapping the organization of the chapters and the theses that I will develop."

== Selected works ==
=== Books ===
- Hekman, Susan (1995). Moral Voices, Moral Selves: Carol Gilligan and Feminist Moral Theory. Maiden: Polity Press. ISBN 0745614213.
- Hekman, Susan; Alaimo, Stacy (2008). Material feminisms. Bloomington: Indiana University Press. ISBN 9780253219466.

=== Journal articles ===
- Hekman, Susan (Winter 1997). "Truth and method: feminist standpoint theory revisited". Signs: Journal of Women in Culture and Society. 22 (2). The University of Chicago Press: 341–365. doi:10.1086/495159. JSTOR 3175275. S2CID 13884397.

See also: Hartsock, Nancy (Winter 1997). "Comment on Hekman's "Truth and Method: Feminist Standpoint Theory Revisited": truth or justice?". Signs: Journal of Women in Culture and Society. 22 (2). The University of Chicago Press: 367–374. doi:10.1086/495161. JSTOR 3175277. S2CID 143503819.
