= Epistemic advantage =

Feminist theory term

Epistemic advantage is a term used within feminist theory when attempting to acquire knowledge from the individual lives and experiences of different women.

The term is used to describe the ways in which women, and other minority groups, are claimed to have a much clearer understanding of how the power structure works within a given society because they are not members of the dominant group. Uma Narayan, a leading feminist theorist writes about epistemic advantage in her essay, "The Project of Feminist Epistemology: Perspectives From A Nonwestern Feminist". Narayan defines epistemic advantage as "(the oppressed) having knowledge of the practices of both their own contexts and those of their oppressors" (Feminist Theory Reader, p. 315). As the feminist movement has moved into the 3rd wave, women's 'intersecting identities' have become increasingly important. There has been an acknowledgement that women of different social locations (with respect to race, class, nationality, sexuality, etc.) will have different experiences. Thus these varying perspectives provide different women with 'advantages' in understanding their own specific social locations within a given society's hierarchal power structure. Uma Narayan has claimed that while it is in the interest of various subordinate groups to have knowledge of the dominant group, the dominant group does not have the same need.

Women of color often are claimed to have a clearer understanding of how not only the gender hierarchy plays out in their daily lives, but the racial and class hierarchies as well of white people too. African-American feminist movements and Mexican-American feminist movements are only a few of the many marginalized groups that have made efforts in discussing their own 'epistemic advantage' within American society. The Combahee River Collective wrote in "A Black Feminist Statement" about the particular struggles of African-American women. They write: "We have spent a great deal of energy delving into the cultural and experiential nature of our oppression out of necessity because none of these matters have ever been looked at before. No one has ever mentioned the multilayered text of black women's lives" (Feminist Theory Reader, p. 167). Thus, it is African-American women's experiences from their specific social location that allows them their own epistemic advantage.

Although there is broad support within feminist scholars for Epistemic Advantage hypothesis, certain feminist scholars recommend avoiding its use. Karen J. Warren points this out in her book Ecological Feminism in which she explains that we "must avoid the potential glorification of oppression that may accompany the positing of 'epistemic advantage' to marginalized groups" (p. 131). One of the primary tenets of feminist thought is to focus on the lived experience of women without creating or maintaining any form of hierarchy within various epistemologies and that all women's experience is of value and importance.
