= Empirical idealism =

Empirical idealism may refer to two distinct positions in Western philosophy:

- Subjective idealism or immaterialism, the empiricist George Berkeley's view that experience leads to this conclusion: all of reality consists of minds or ideas, including what we perceive as physical objects
- Transcendental idealism, Immanuel Kant's view that, prior to or beyond mere experience, the mind is fashioned with certain innate and biased ways of processing experience
