= Positionality statement =

Description of one's group identities

A positionality statement, also called reflexivity statement or identity statement, is a statement wherein a person (such as a researcher or teacher) reports and discusses their group identities, such as in a grant proposal or journal submission. They have become commonplace in certain fields of social science, especially within the United States.

Positionality statements focus on an "author's racial, gender, class, or other self-identifications, experiences, and privileges", based on the idea that the author's identity can, intentionally or not, influence the results of their research. Scholars have commonly identified this risk in cases where the researcher is the sole point of connection between the audience and research subjects and, relatedly, when there exists a known power imbalance between the researcher and the research subject. The expectation and/or practice of writing a positionality statement can also inform the researcher of ways to mitigate the influence of their personal identity on the research by clarifying such interactions before the data collection or analysis process concludes.

== Criticism ==
Positionality statements have also attracted controversy, being alternatively labeled by detractors as "research segregation", "positional piety", and "loyalty oaths". According to critics, an author may claim moral authority through affinity with subjects, or through a confession of difference of relative privilege. This has raised concern that positionality statements can lead to "positional piety," in which researchers are deemed more or less credible based on race, gender, or other characteristics. On the other hand, supporters of positionality statements point out that such criticisms often stem from "bad" positionality statements and instead argue for a comprehensive standard of quality.

== In education ==
Positionality statements have increased in popularity during the 2000s, required not just of researchers, but also students. A challenge has been the phenomenon of "phony positionality", wherein students learn to voice the beliefs expected in positionality statements without actually believing them. This "performative" positionality has been an obstacle to their adoption in the classroom.

== See also ==
- Perspectivism
- Postmodernism
- Social constructionism
- Standpoint theory
- Subjectivity
