= Feminist empiricism =

Perspective within feminist research

Feminist empiricism is a perspective within feminist research that challenges traditional scientific methodologies and values. The framework argues against a value-free science. Feminist empiricism puts forward that the notion of a value-free science produces and reproduces sexist and gendered thought. Feminist empiricism is typically connected to mainstream notions of positivism. Feminist empiricism critiques what it perceives to be inadequacies and biases within mainstream research methods, including positivism.

Feminist empiricism is one of three main feminist epistemological perspectives. The other two are standpoint feminism and post-structural/postmodern feminism.

== Example ==
In international relations rationalist feminism employs feminist empiricism to explain the political landscape. Rationalist feminism examines state, transnational and institutional actors, and specifically looks at causal relationships between these actors and gender issues. Quantitative data is used to relate gender to these phenomena. This may be done by directly correlating gender data to specific state behaviors, or indirectly by examining a "gender gap" through indirect causal relationships. Popular perspectives linked to rationalist feminism within international relations include conventional constructivism and quantitative peace research.

== Epistemological perspectives ==
=== Standpoint feminism ===
Among other criticisms, standpoint feminism also known as anti-rational, argues that feminist empiricism cannot explain the way the political world works because the foundations on which it is built are based on the same gendered assumptions that all mainstream scientific inquiries face. Feminist empiricism argues that, because of its epistemological outlook, it can tackle this inherent gender bias within scientific inquiry.

=== Postmodern feminism ===
Post-structural/postmodern feminist epistemology is entirely discursive, seeking to develop understanding through social analysis; to interpret rather than explain feminist theories in the political world.

Feminist empiricism is more likely to favor qualitative data. Objective measurements are seen as important to eliminating the gender bias that exists. Post-structuralism is inherently opposed to the idea of an objective truth in the social sciences. The belief is that those who study within the human sciences are ensnared by the same structures that affect the society in which they study. Post-structural feminism critiques the belief that any viewpoint is impartial; knowledge is not found but constructed. A specific result of this disagreement is the way in which the two theories view gender: feminist empiricism claims that gender variables are based on biological sex, while post-structural/postmodern feminism sees gender as a socially constituted entity.

== See also ==
- Feminism
- Postmodern feminism
- Standpoint feminism
