= Esmaa Mohamoud =

African-Canadian sculpture and installation artist (born 1962)

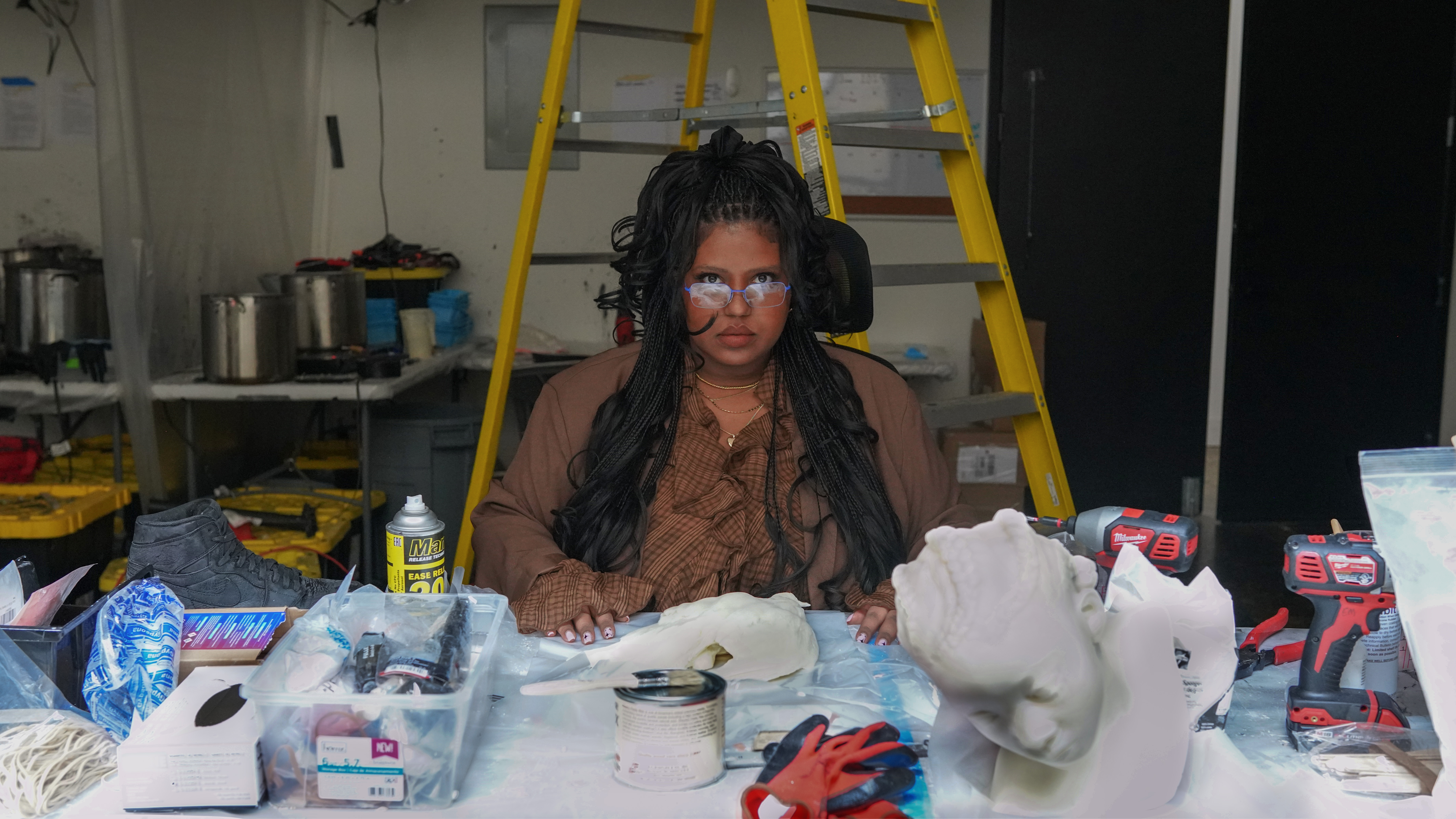
- Mohamoud at work in her studio
- Born: 25 November 1992 (age 33)
- Education: B.A., Western University; M.A. Ontario College of Art and Design
- Occupations: Sculptor and installation artist

Esmaa Mohamoud, also known as "E," (born 25 November 1992) is an African-Canadian sculptor and installation artist who grew up in London, Ontario, and currently practices in Toronto, Ontario. Her work has been shown at the Royal Ontario Museum, McGill University, The Art Gallery of Ontario, YYZ Artist Outlet, The Drake Devonshire Gallery, Art Lab Gallery at Western University, Georgia Scherman Projects, amongst others.

Mohamoud grew up with four brothers, in which she was constantly made aware of gender norms and expectations. She graduated from Western University with a Bachelor's in fine art in 2014 and later from Ontario College of Art and Design University, in June 2016, with a master's degree in fine arts. Her art focuses on interrogating issues around black masculinity culturally in sports (in the NBA and NFL) and politically in North American society at large. She creates sculptures, photography, and drawings to bring awareness to and to expose these specific issues in today's society. Mohamoud's outstanding notable works include exhibits One of the Boys, Heavy, Heavy (Hoop Dreams), Glorious Bones, Blood and Tears Instead of Milk and Honey, A Seat Above the Table, Untitled (No Fields) Why See the World When You've Got the Beach?, Chain Gang, I Am Series, and Unholy Matrimony.

== Selected works ==
=== One of the Boys (2017–2018) ===
From 2017–2018, Mohamoud collaborated with Qendrim Hoti to create and photograph sculptures designed to be worn by black, male-presenting models. In One of the Boys, men and women wear custom-made ball gown jerseys, thus pointing to gender fluidity and race through their use of fashion. Mohamoud uses Vince Carter's Raptors jerseys for the top half of the gown and the bottom half is a beautiful puffy dress. The jersey itself is not of the usual sports mesh, but is made of velvet and contains corset lacings on both sides an allusion to basketball through the use of shoelaces and to high fashion through the use of corseted tops. Some of the models can be seen wearing jewelry such as earrings, rings, necklaces, colorful hair ties, braids, and tattoos. Amanda Parris points out that some of the models in this series face away from the camera or conversely they stare directly at it, something Mohamoud terms the "power stance."

Fashion and body language work in this piece works in tandem to create a harmonious balance between femininity and masculinity. This balance of feminine and masculine objects and poise convey the overarching theme of gender fluidity depicted on and through black, male bodies. Mohamoud's design of the jersey and the ballgown is meant to convey gender fluidity in a way in which it is difficult for viewers to categorize the subject of the photographs in a binary fashion. The Raptors jersey itself is meant to symbolize masculinity, as athleticism is usually thought to be masculine, and the ballgowns are meant to symbolize femininity.

The title of the series, One of the Boys, is derived from the artist's personal experiences. Mohamoud recalls her mother requiring that she wear a dress when she wanted to play basketball with the neighborhood boys. Mohamoud stated that she wore a dress and put a Raptors jersey on top to which her mother reprimanded, "you are not one of the boys." Mohamoud reflects on what this statement meant to her during her childhood when tension existed between her wanting to play basketball like Vince Carter and her societal obligation to align herself with feminine ideals. One of the Boys is meant to dissipate this tension Mohamoud felt throughout her childhood and the tension that many others, specifically young, black men may feel.

One of the Boys explores and exposes how black male bodies and notions of masculinity have been shaped and viewed by society. Mohamoud focuses on black men in sports and uses basketball specifically to explore societal problems around the construction of black masculinity. In the book Black Sexual Politics, Patricia Hills Collins explains how and why black masculinity is treated and viewed the way it is in sports, specifically in basketball. Collins shares the story about a professional black basketball player named Latrell Sprewell, playing for the Golden State Warriors at the time, who choked his coach P. J. Carlesimo. Collins says Sprewell was viewed "as the worst of basketball" and his actions gave a bad reputation to all black basketball players. Collins notes that black basketball players are thought of as irrational "bad boys" that are too sensitive and can't control their aggressive nature when provoked. Collins states Sprewell's mistake contributed to a societal belief that black basketball players are a bad example of masculinity and establishes the idea that all black men are violent, greedy, childish, rule breakers, and "too black". Since black male masculinity was deemed out of control, sports have been used to control and polish black masculinity to be more like white masculinity. Collins argues that it is clear that society believes people must "submit to White male authority in order to learn how to be a man," and this is what Esmaa Mohamoud is fighting against with and through her art. Mohamoud argues that, "[i]f we don't take up space, a white body will."

Through this series, Mohamoud attempts to combat pervasive associations of black male bodies with hypermasculinity, violence, and ruggedness, by engaging the models in hyper-feminine clothes and poses. The artist recalls that many people in her hometown of London, Canada were fearful of blackness as Black people, particularly Black men, are perceived in violet light. Author and activist, bell hooks, has acknowledged in her book, We Real Cool: Black Men and Masculinity, the long-standing belief that black men are the embodiment of violence and aggression, stating "read any article or book on black masculinity and it will convey the message that Black men are violent." This image of violence can be dangerous for black men as they navigate their way through the world. To counter this, Mohamoud attempts to offer black men the freedom of gender fluidity. By clothing black, male models in velvet gowns, Mohamoud shields them with the notion that black men can too possess the ability to be fragile and soft.

Through her art, Mohamoud brings awareness to a current and problematic view of black masculinity in order to shift it and reclaim it as her own through subversion of gender norms, "power stances," and the use of bell hooks' the "oppositional gaze."

=== Heavy, Heavy (Hoop Dreams) (2016) ===
In 2016, Esmaa Mohamoud displayed Heavy, Heavy (Hoop Dreams) as part of her Interdisciplinary Master's in Art, Media, and Design Program. Heavy, Heavy (Hoop Dreams) consists of 60 deflated concrete basketballs in a grid on the floor. The original piece was supposed to have 30 basketballs, the amount of first-round picks in the NBA, but Mohamoud settled on 60 basketballs as it filled up more space and is the number of second-round picks for the NBA.

Mohamoud uses concrete to show the heaviness and fragileness that comes from people relying on getting scouted by the NBA. The artist ensures that the concrete basketballs will crack and fall apart as it symbolizes the disappearance of a future career.

The title is influenced by Hoop Dreams, a documentary following black boys who never made it to the NBA. Mohamoud added the Heavy Heavy as a reference to the disappointment black boys feel when they are not scouted for the NBA.

=== Glorious Bones (2018) ===
Glorious Bones (2018) comprises a unique set of 46 hollowed-out football helmets made from repurposed helmets, wax cloth, steel, and recycled tires. Each is made to display vivid kente cloth patterns, symbolizing both the royal Ghanaian weaving tradition and a textile that has come to represent an African diasporic identity. Kente cloth is an "iconic" visual representation of the history, philosophy, ethics, oral literature, religious belief, social values, and political thought of West Africa. Each cloth has a name and an individual pattern as well; once worn only by royalty, it is now more mainstream and worn by anyone who can afford it. Kente is a key symbol of African heritage and pride, regarded as a symbol of social prestige, nobility, and cultural sophistication.

Each helmet is hung individually to express elements of emptiness, the decoration of the critique of the Black body being dispossessed in the eye of professional sports, and the emptiness of the helmets to include an ominous presence to express the toll that sports can have on one's body.

Black bodies are often rendered invisible within the spaces they navigate, including the professional sports industry. Mohamoud transforms these helmets, to illustrate discriminatory behaviors and attitudes based on race, class, gender and sexuality. With a reference made in the piece surrounded by a quote from a scene in Remember the Titans about the Battle of Gettysburg, and using the juxtaposition of the helmets and the quotation, Glorious Bones highlights the ideological contradictions and racial dynamics in sports and sports cinema. Examining aspects of race, class, gender and sexuality to present the individual struggle each faces, Mohamoud specifically focuses on homogenizations of bodies within these high-level athletics as sites of corporate profit and discrimination.
