= Roxana Ng =

- Born: 28 May 1951; Diamond Hill, Hong Kong
- Died: 12 January 2013 (aged 61); Toronto, Ontario

Academic background
- Education: University of British Columbia (BA, MA); University of Toronto (PhD)

Academic work
- Discipline: Sociology, Pedagogy, Women's studies, Migration studies

Roxana Chu-Yee Ng (1951–2013) was an activist and scholar for fair migrant labour, gender and racial equality, and decolonising pedagogy. She is noted for her research on the garment industry in Canada.

Ng trained in sociology and taught at the University of New Brunswick, Queen's University, and the Ontario Institute for Studies in Education (OISE) at the University of Toronto. She taught sociology, adult education, and community development, and directed the OISE Centre for Women's Studies in Education from 2009 to 2013.

Ng was active in immigrant women's and garment workers' organising from the mid-1970s onwards, particularly in Toronto. She served as a board member of Inter Pares and as a board member then president (1994–95) of the Canadian Research Institute for the Advancement of Women (CRIAW).

== Life ==
=== Early years ===
Roxana Ng was born in 1951 in Diamond Hill, a hill in the east of Kowloon Walled City in Hong Kong which used to be a large urban squatter village. (Note: Diamond Hill underwent rapid social and architectural transformation in the 1950s and 1960s.) In 1968, she left to attend The Mount School, a Quaker boarding school in York, England. There, she was asked to change her name from Ng to Wu (the Mandarin translation) to make pronunciation easier for native English speakers. Ng refused. After graduation in 1970, she moved to Vancouver with her family. When they immigrated, Ng kept her last name; the rest of her family took on the Mandarin translation ("Wu").

=== Education and teaching ===
Ng trained in sociology at the University of British Columbia for her Bachelor's and Master's degrees. During her final years of study in Vancouver, Ng dedicated a large portion of her time to caring for family during her mother's sickness.

In 1977, she co-founded the Vancouver Women's Research Centre (VWRC), an independent feminist organisation known for its participatory approach to research. VWRC was "founded on the principle that all research on women must start with women and must include their perception on the project, the parameters, the process, and the questions raised." VWRC's work helped identify and address problems faced by women—particularly immigrant women—of economic development, domestic violence, and sexual harassment. Its publications included a 1980 report on sexual harassment in the workplace undertaken in collaboration with the British Columbia Federation of Labour. Ng went on to set up similar centres for immigrant women across Canada.

In 1978, Ng moved to Toronto to do her PhD at the Ontario Institute for Studies in Education (OISE) at the University of Toronto, which she received in 1984. She was mentored by Dorothy E. Smith and became involved with Women Working with Immigrant Women (1979) and INTERCEDE (1980) during this time.

In the years that followed, Ng taught at the University of New Brunswick and Queen's University. She returned to OISE in 1988 as professor, first teaching sociology and later, adult education and community development. Ng directed the OISE Centre for Women's Studies in Education (CWSE) from 2009 to 2013.

=== Death ===
On January 12, 2013, Ng died at Sunnybrook Health Sciences Centre in Toronto after a short fight with cancer.

== Scholarship and activism ==
=== Scholarship ===
Ng is noted for her scholarship on the garment industry in Canada and its relation to immigration, gender, race, and class, as well as her contributions to institutional ethnography, embodied learning, and critical pedagogy. One major strand of her work documented the experiences of migrant women in Canada and their identity construction in a globalised world and labour market. Another strand of her work sought insight from Eastern philosophy and practice to integrate the mind and body split characteristic of traditional academia and higher education. Ng has also written on the experience of academia from the standpoint of a racialized immigrant woman.

Ng's 1999 study, conducted on 30 Chinese-speaking homeworkers, found that wages were frozen at early 1980s levels (below minimum wage for homeworkers); none were receiving overtime pay (instead being paid per piece); and all reported work-related injuries. Ng estimated that there were around 8,000 women, many of them from Asia, who were homeworkers in the Toronto garment industry. These homeworkers, who were paid by the piece, "regularly ha[d] their piece rate reduced as their productivity increase[d]." Many garments sewn by homeworkers "[did] not have retail and manufacturing labels, making their employers difficult to trace and regulate," such that only two of the 30 interviewed workers reported labels on garments. The study was cited at a press conference at Queen's Park.

In a review of Ng's scholarship, Elaine Coburn deems Ng "one of Canadian sociology and political economy’s most underappreciated theorists" whose research and theorising "was and remains relatively marginalised within more mainstream academic publications." Coburn also wrote:

Ng’s work is motivated by a commitment to socially just change. Arguably, this commitment informed her efforts towards analytical rigour and clarity, since the stakes of social change do not allow for sloppy analyses that might mislead solidarity work with and for the exploited and oppressed. This rigour included a reflexive awareness of the personal costs of social change, since struggles with and for dominated actors inevitably face the countervailing powers of dominant actors whose interests are threatened by the possibilities of fundamental social transformation. Sometimes, Ng observed, even forms of civility are dangerous for social change, as when empathetic desires to maintain harmonious relationships with “those close to us” lead us to mute our critiques of social justice (Ng, 1993, p.200). Likewise, Ng examined the ways that dominated actors–and even we who think of ourselves as working for social justice–may reproduce unjust inequalities and relations of exploitation, despite our best intentions.

=== Organising work ===
Ng was active in immigrant women's and garment workers' organising from the mid-1970s onwards, and "continue[d] to refine her conceptualization of race, gender, and class relations based on her organizing experiences." She served as a board member of Inter Pares and as board member then president (1994–95) of the Canadian Research Institute for the Advancement of Women (CRIAW). The organisations she supported included the following:

Organisation	Active years
Women Working with Immigrant Women (WWIW)	1979–1992
International Coalition to End Domestics' Exploitation (INTERCEDE)	1980–2001
National Organization of Immigrant and Visible Minority Women of Canada (NOICMWC)	1986–1992
Canadian Research Institute for the Advancement of Women (CRIAW)	1986–2010
Jade Garden Adjustment Committee (Note: This committee provided support for workers displaced by the closing of the Jade Garden Restaurant.)	1988–2005
Apparel Textile Action Committee (ATAC)	1989–1995
International Ladies' Garment Workers' Union (ILGWU)	1992–1994
Union of Needletrades, Industrial and Textile Employees (UNITE)	1995–2001
Homeworkers' Association	1995–2007
Joint Centre of Excellence for Research on Immigration and Settlement (CERIS)	1997–2008
Inter Pares	1999–2004

== Selected works ==
- "Decolonizing Teaching and Learning Through Embodied Learning: Toward an Integrated Approach." In Sharing Breath: Embodied Learning and Decolonization, edited by Sheila Batacharya and Yuk-Lin Renita Wong. Edmonton: Athabasca University Press, 2018. doi: 10.15215/aupress/9781771991919.01 (Open Access - CC BY-NC-ND 4.0)
- "Lifelong Learning as Ideological Practice: An Analysis from the Perspective of Immigrant Women in Canada." International Journal of Lifelong Education 29, no. 2 (2010): 169–184. doi: 10.1080/02601371003616574
- "Toward an Integrative Approach to Equity in Education." In Pedagogies of Difference: Rethinking Education for Social Justice, 197–210. New York: Routledge, 2003. doi: 10.4324/9780203465547
- "Integrating Community Diversity in Toronto: On Whose Terms?" In The World in a City, edited by C. Michael Lanphier and Paul Anisef, 373–456. Toronto: University of Toronto Press, 2003.
- "Toward an Embodied Pedagogy: Exploring Health and the Body through Chinese Medicine." In Indigenous Knowledges in Global Contexts: Multiple Readings of Our World, edited by George J. Sefa Dei, Budd L. Hall, and Dorothy Goldin Rosenberg, 168–183. Toronto: University of Toronto Press, 2000.
- The Politics of Community Services: Immigrant Women, Class and the State. 2nd ed. Halifax: Fernwood Publishing, 1996. (Available through Internet Archive's Open Library)
- Anti-Racism, Feminism, and Critical Approaches to Education, edited by Roxana Ng, Pat Staton, and Joyce Scane. Westport: Bergin & Garvey, 1995. (Available through Internet Archive's Open Library)
- "Racism, Sexism, and Nation Building in Canada." In Race, Identity, and Representation in Education, edited by Cameron McCarthy and Warren Crichlow, 50–59. 1st ed. New York: Routledge, 1993. (Available through Google Books)
- "A Woman Out of Control: Deconstructing Sexism and Racism in the University." Canadian Journal of Education / Revue canadienne de l'éducation 18, no. 3 (Summer 1993): 189–205. doi: 10.2307/1495382
- Community Organization and the Canadian State, edited by Roxana Ng, Gilian Walker, and Jacob Muller. Toronto: Garamond Press, 1990. (Available through Internet Archive's Open Library)
- Immigrant Housewives in Canada: A Report. Toronto: Immigrant Women's Centre, 1981.
