= Institutional ethnography =

Theory and method in sociology

Institutional ethnography (IE) is an alternative approach of studying and understanding the social. IE has been described as an alternative philosophical paradigm, sociology, or (qualitative) research method. IE explores the social relations that structure people's everyday lives, specifically by looking at the ways that people interact with one another in the context of social institutions (school, marriage, work, for example) and understanding how those interactions are institutionalized. IE is best understood as an ethnography of interactions which have been institutionalized, rather than an ethnography of specific companies, organizations or employment sectors, which would be considered industrial sociology or the sociology of work. For the institutional ethnographer, ordinary daily activity becomes the site for an investigation of social organization.

IE was first developed by Dorothy E. Smith as a Marxist feminist sociology "for women, for people"; and is now used by researchers in social sciences, education, nursing, human services and policy research as a method for mapping the translocal relations that coordinate people's activities within institutions.

== See also ==
- Dorothy E. Smith
- Roxana Ng
