= From Black Power to Hip Hop =

2006 book by Patricia Hill Collins

- Author: Patricia Hill Collins
- Language: English
- Publisher: Temple University Press
- Publication date: 2006; 20 years ago
- Publication place: United States
- Media type: Print (hardcover, paperback)
- Pages: 256

From Black Power to Hip-Hop: Racism, Nationalism, and Feminism is a 2006 book by Patricia Hill Collins. Published by Temple University Press, the book centers on the author's experiences with racism in America, and also includes experiences from other Black men and women and their responses to it. In the end, Collins offers her take on Black youth and how it is changing, along with how Black nationalism works today.

== Summary ==
=== Part I: Race, Family, and the U.S. Nation-State ===
- "Like One of the Family: Race, Ethnicity, and the Paradox of American National Identity": The preliminary essay discusses the family unit as a prominent part of the American national identity as well as point of citizenship. In this, Collins makes critiques about the Western feminist's perception of the family as a point of female oppression throughout history; how the idea of a nuclear family has frequently left women with less power. She links ideas of racism and nationalism due to their “mutually constructing categories.”
- "Will the 'Real' Mother Please Stand Up? The Logic of Eugenics and American National Family Planning": This essay examines the designated role of motherhood and how it links gender to nationalism. How women remain crucial in nationalist ideologies, but in a narrow-minded scope. Feminist scholars have long discussed the concepts of feminism and nationalism and how gendered the latter is, with women being put in certain boxes of requirements to fill for her nation-state. Her roles include the obvious carrying on of the population – i.e., her role as a mother – her keeping of traditional culture and ability to pass it on, and an aspect of the nation serving as motivation to protect.

=== Part II: Ethnicity, Culture, and Black Nationalist Politics ===
- "Black Nationalism and African American Ethnicity: The Case of Afrocentrism as Civil Religion": This set of essays discusses the idea of African nationalism as experienced by African-Americans, the longest oppressed group of people in United States history. When African Americans pursue ethnic mobilization, their sentiments are disregarded and considered anti-American, and separatist. Essentially this essay brings to light the discomfort that arises when African Americans voice concerns that are outside of the comfort box.
- "When Fighting Words Are Not Enough: The Gendered Content of Afrocentrism": The fourth chapter of the book is informative in that it discusses the introduction of Black cultural nationalism into the world of academia. Essentially, the idea that the problem with Afrocentrism is not solely White resistance – though that was indeed a factor – but rather that the problems within the idea itself were also to blame.

=== Part III: Feminism, Nationalism, and African American Women ===
- "Why Collective Identity Politics Matter: Feminism, Nationalism, and Black Women's Community Work": The final section of the book is dedicated to the concept of feminism, largely as it relates to Black Women. Specifically, Collins seeks to analyze Black American women's acts of community service as it pertains to their political involvement. Collins suggests that gender be at the head of Black political agendas, that this can make Black American women gain strength and a voice in the political sphere.
- "Is the Personal Still Political? The Women's Movement, Feminism, and Black Women in the Hip-Hop Generation": It is somewhat overlooked – though gaining more traction – that to be a Black feminist-leaning woman in America during the Hip-Hop era is often a contradicting one. Additionally, Black Women may have a more conflicting time than other racial groups of women when it comes to finding their voice in the political world.

== Reception ==
The reviewer for Publishers Weekly writes that "sociologist Collins turns her eye toward young African American women who have chosen to explore feminism through pop culture instead of academia in this sometimes rousing, sometimes plodding anthology of six essays.... (H)er analysis of the choices facing women of the hip hop generation is provocative and invaluable."

Afrikanlibrary.net says: "Using the experiences of African American women and men as a touchstone for analysis, Patricia Hill Collins examines new forms of racism as well as political responses to it.In this incisive and stimulating book, renowned social theorist Patricia Hill Collins investigates how nationalism has operated and re-emerged in the wake of contemporary globalization and offers an interpretation of how black nationalism works today in the wake of changing black youth identity."

== See also ==
- Black Sexual Politics: African Americans, Gender, and the New Racism
- Misogyny in hip hop culture
