= Patricia Hill Collins =

American scholar (born 1948)

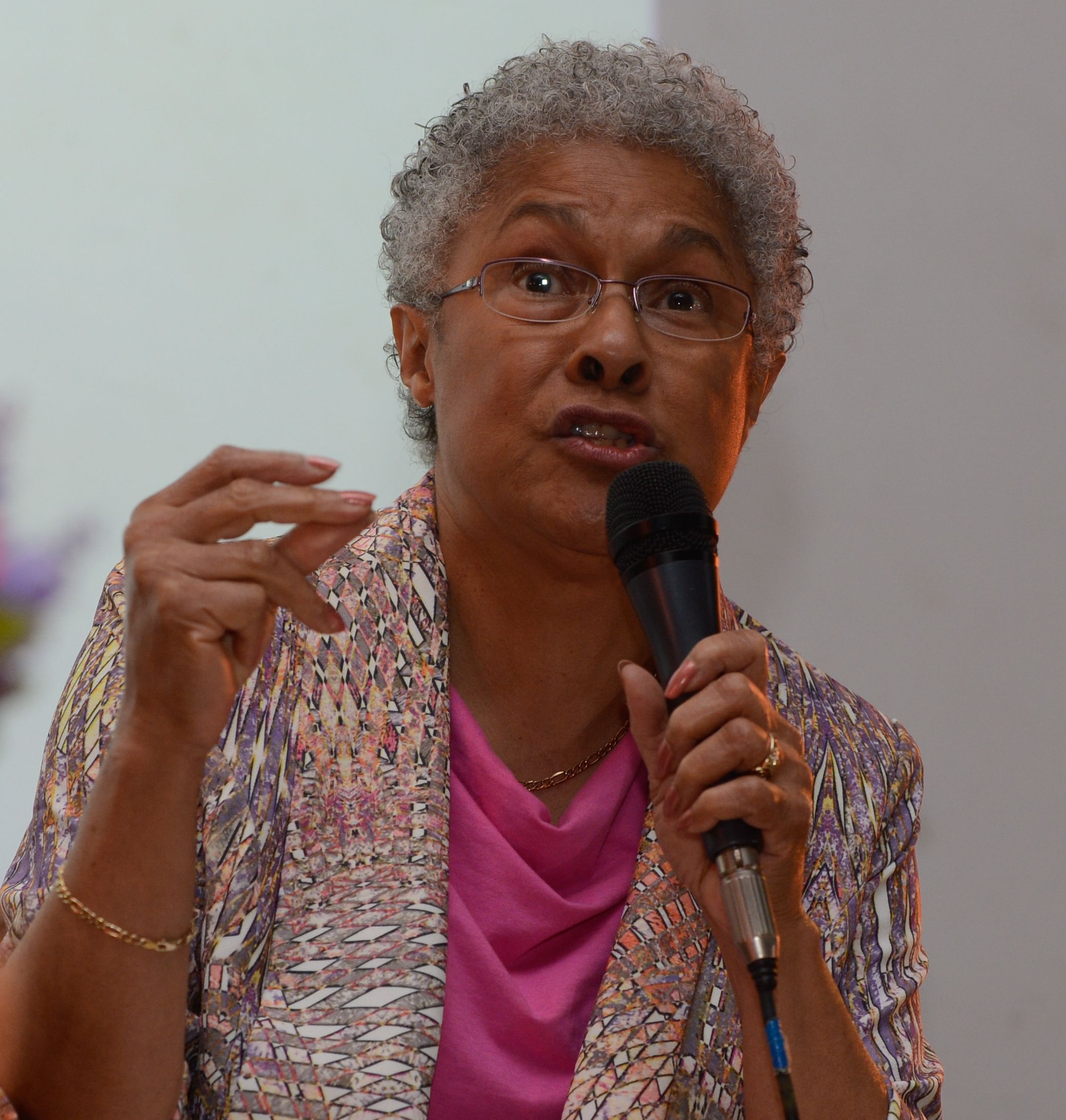
- Born: Patricia Hill; May 1, 1948 (age 78); Philadelphia, Pennsylvania, U.S.
- Awards: Berggruen Prize (2023)

Academic background
- Education: Brandeis University (BA, PhD); Harvard University (MA)
- Thesis: Race, Gender, and Labor Market Structure (1983)
- Influences: Angela Davis; Ida B. Wells; Pauli Murray; Toni Morrison

Academic work
- Discipline: African-American studies; Sociology; Gender studies
- Sub-discipline: Social theory; sociology of knowledge
- School or tradition: American pragmatism; Black feminism; feminist sociology
- Institutions: University of Cincinnati; University of Maryland, College Park
- Notable works: Black Feminist Thought (1990)
- Notable ideas: Intersectionality; matrix of domination; controlling images

Patricia Hill Collins (born May 1, 1948) is an American academic specializing in race, class, and gender. She is a distinguished university professor of sociology emerita at the University of Maryland, College Park. She is also the former head of the Department of African-American Studies at the University of Cincinnati. Collins was elected president of the American Sociological Association (ASA), and served in 2009 as the 100th president of the association – the first African-American woman to hold this position.

Collins's work primarily concerns issues involving race, gender, and social inequality within the African-American community. She gained national attention for her book Black Feminist Thought, originally published in 1990.

In 2023, she was awarded the Berggruen Prize for Philosophy & Culture.

== Family background ==
Patricia Hill Collins was born on May 1, 1948, in Philadelphia, Pennsylvania, the only child of two parents living in a predominately Black, working-class neighborhood. Her father, Albert Hill, a factory worker and a Second World War veteran, and her mother, Eunice Hill, a secretary, met in Washington, DC. Since both of Collins' parents worked, she began attending daycare at two and a half years old. Collins' love for reading and education came from her mother, who had always wanted to be an English teacher and briefly attended Howard University. Unable to afford the tuition, Eunice was not able to graduate. After her daughter was born, Eunice made sure that she was exposed to literature at a young age, teaching her to read and introducing her to the public library. Collins is married to Dr. Roger L. Collins, a professor emeritus at the University of Cincinnati. They have one daughter, Valerie L. Collins, a labor law attorney.

== Early life ==
As a child, Collins felt safe and secure in her stable Black working-class neighborhood. As she played in the streets with her friends freely, she trusted the safety of her observant community. She would spend time outside roller skating and jumping double Dutch rope on her block with her friends. She and her friends enjoyed making and singing music together. A musician, she can play the trumpet, piano, and organ. While in high school Collins worked at her church playing the organ. As she got older, Collins began to notice she was either the first, one of the few, or only African Americans and/or woman or working-class person in her communities. Of this, she wrote:

"I saw nothing wrong with being who I was, but apparently many others did. My world grew larger, but I felt I was growing smaller. I tried to disappear into myself in order to deflect the painful, daily assaults designed to teach me that being an African American, working-class woman made me lesser than those who were not. And as I felt smaller, I became quieter and eventually was virtually silenced."

== Education ==
Collins attended Philadelphia public schools—and even at a young age, Collins had realized that she attended schools that catered to mostly white middle-class students. During the 1950s and 1960s, when she was going to school, most schools in northern cities such as Philadelphia were channels for social mobility for Black migrants from the South or immigrants from Europe. Although they were adequately funded, they were not particularly easy to navigate, especially for African Americans and people of color like Collins. However, she was part of a group of young people who had access to educational resources and opportunities their parents did not.

=== Elementary school and high school ===
As a child, Collins attended Frederick Douglas Elementary School. Later, she attended Philadelphia High School for Girls (known as Girls' High), which was founded in 1848 as the nation's first public high school for women. Collins was in attendance during the 1960s, which was when the process of the desegregation of schools began in the United States. This contributed to her growing interest in sociology, feminism, and activism for African-Americans and civil rights.

=== College education ===
In 1965, Collins went on to pursue an undergraduate career at Brandeis University in Waltham, Massachusetts, as a sociology major. While in college she devoted time to fostering progressive educational models in the schools of Boston's Black community. She graduated cum laude with honors with a Bachelor of Arts degree in sociology in 1969.

She proceeded to earn a Master of Arts degree in Teaching (MAT) in Social Science Education from Harvard University in 1970. From 1970 to 1976, she was a middle school teacher, curriculum specialist, and community organizer at St. Joseph Community School in Roxbury, Boston, and two other schools. Of which she says enabled her "to explore the connections among critical pedagogy, engaged scholarship, and the politics of knowledge production, delaying for a decade the deadening 'publish or perish' ethos of higher education. Instead, it put me on a different path of being a rigorous scholar and a public intellectual with an eye toward social justice traditions."

In 1984, she completed her doctorate in sociology at Brandeis University.

== Career ==
From 1976 to 1980 she was the director of the Africana Center at Tufts University. As such Collins worked on issues of diversity, equity and inclusion through bringing the research, ideas, and culture Black communities to the campus. Additionally, she had aimed to bring attention to issues surrounding Black women.

While earning her Ph.D., Collins worked as an assistant professor at the University of Cincinnati beginning in 1982. She taught in the Department of Africana Studies for more than two decades and retired in 2005 as the Charles Phelps Taft Distinguished Professor of Sociology.

In 1986, Collins published her first major article, "Learning from the Outsider Within," in the sociological journal Social Problems. The article focuses on how Black women gain special insight on social inequality from their marginalized placement as being both Black and women. Black women have been able to creatively fight against the status quo.

In 1990, Collins published her first book, Black Feminist Thought: Knowledge, Consciousness and the Politics of Empowerment. A revised 10th-anniversary edition of the book was published in 2000 and a 30th-anniversary edition in 2023. The book was translated into Korean in 2009, French in 2016, and Portuguese in 2019.

In 2005, Collins joined the University of Maryland's department of sociology as a distinguished university professor. Working closely with graduate students on issues such as critical race theory, intersectionality, and feminist theory, she maintains an active research agenda and continues to write books and articles in relation to social, racial, and gender issues. Her work has achieved international recognition. Collins is focused on understanding, in her own words, "How African American male and female youth's experiences with social issues of education, unemployment, popular culture and political activism articulate with global phenomena, specifically, complex social inequalities, global capitalist development, transnationalism, and political activism."

=== Black Feminist Thought: Knowledge, Consciousness and the Politics of Empowerment ===
In 1990, Collins published Black Feminist Thought: Knowledge, Consciousness and the Politics of Empowerment, whose approach to the title topic was influenced by such figures as Angela Davis, Alice Walker and Audre Lorde. The analysis drew on a wide range of sources, including fiction, poetry, music, and oral history. Collins's work concluded with three central claims:

- Oppressions of race, class, gender, sexuality, and nation are intersecting, mutually constructing systems of power. Collins utilizes the term intersectionality, coined by Kimberlé Crenshaw, to refer to this simultaneous overlapping of multiple forms of oppression as a matrix of domination.
- Because black women have unique histories at the intersections of systems of power, they have created world views out of a need for self-definition and to work on behalf of social justice. Black women's specific experiences with intersecting systems of oppression provide a window into these same processes for other individuals and social groups. Systems of oppression that Collins mentions are government agencies, schools, and the news.
- Black feminist thought on race and gender came from Black communities rather than in opposition to white feminism.

In Black Feminist Thought, Collins posits how Black feminist inquiry highlights two very important themes. One is "how Black women's paid work is organized within intersecting oppressions of race, class, and gender." Although these women no longer work in domestic work in private homes, they continue to work at low-paying jobs in the growing service sector. Moreover, she continues, the theme that "concerns how Black women's unpaid family labor is simultaneously confining and empowering" for them is also extremely important. Collins emphasizes this point because she points out that Black women see the unpaid work of their household as a method of resistance to oppression rather than solely as a method of manipulation by men.

In an interview with Global Dialogue magazine in 2017, Collins restated the argument that she laid out in Black Feminist Thought by emphasizing the controlling images faced by Black women: "In Black Feminist Thought, I examine how African-American women confront four main stereotypes: (1) the mule, the woman who works like an animal without complaint; (2) the jezebel, the highly sexualized woman who is often depicted as a prostitute; (3) the mammy, the Black woman domestic worker whose loyalty to her employer is beyond reproach; and (4) the Black lady, the educated Black woman who has given up family life in exchange for a career". These controlling images are utilized mainly to make black women's subjugated state of being harassed and silenced appear standard and natural.

In an interview with Oklahoma's KGOU radio station in 2017, Collins' discussed her careful process while writing the book: "I think it was very difficult for me to come to voice around the types of work that I do because there was no space for this work," Collins says. "We had to create the space to write black feminist thought, to talk about race, class, gender, to talk about intersectionality. And that was all part of the process of being seen as legitimate, being listened to, being clear, being respected"

=== Race, Class and Gender: An Anthology ===
Published in 1992, Race, Class, and Gender: An Anthology was a collaboration with Margaret L. Andersen, in which Collins edited a compilation of essays on race, class, and gender. The book is widely recognized for shaping the field of race, class, and gender studies, as well as its related concept of intersectionality. The essays cover a variety of topics, from historical trends and their effects today, to the current media portrayal of minority groups. The tenth edition was published in 2020.

=== Fighting Words: Black Women and the Search for Justice ===
Collins' third book Fighting Words: Black Women and the Search for Justice was published in 1998. Fighting Words focused on how Black women's knowledge examines social injustices within Black communities and wider society. Expanding on the idea of "outsiders within" from her previous book, she examines how outsiders resist the majority's perspective, while simultaneously pushing for and creating new insight into the social injustices that exist. Collins also notes how acknowledging the social theories of oppressed groups are important because their different experiences have created new angles of looking at human rights and injustice. This has not always been the case because, as she points out, "elites possess the power to legitimate the knowledge that they define as theory as being universal, normative, and ideal".

In 2021, Collins was interviewed by the Oprah Winfrey Network, "Finding the Full-Range of Your Voice," where she reflected on her quote, "publicly articulating rage typically constitutes less a revelation about oppression than a discovery of voice." She says that the terminology now would be "speaking your own truth, claiming all parts of yourself, including the rage." She asserts, "Why would we reject anger, when there's so much to be angry about that affects us, that affect our children, that affects our communities, that affects our loved ones? Why would we want to tamp that down to become a good girl?"

=== Black Sexual Politics: African Americans, Gender, and the New Racism ===
Collins's next book, Black Sexual Politics: African Americans, Gender, and the New Racism, was published in 2004 and won the Distinguished Scholarly Book Award from the American Sociological Association. This work argued that racism and heterosexism were intertwined in multiple areas of life. For example, how ideals of beauty work to oppress African-Americans males and females, whether homosexual, bisexual or heterosexual. Collins asserts that people must examine the intersection of race, class, gender, and sexuality because looking at each issue separately can cause one to miss a large part of the problem. Her argument for resisting the creation of such narrow gender roles requires action on individual and community levels as well as recognizing success in areas other than those typically respected by Americans, such as money or beauty. Collins also contends that the oppression of African Americans cannot be successfully resisted without analyzing how intersecting oppressions influence their own group, such as the treatment of women or LGBTQ people.

=== From Black Power to Hip Hop: Racism, Nationalism, and Feminism ===
In 2006, Collins published From Black Power to Hip Hop: Racism, Nationalism, and Feminism, which examines the relationship between black nationalism, feminism and women in the hip-hop generation. The book is a collection of essays by her, written over multiple years, compiled into one cohesive examination of the current situation of African Americans. Collins examines contemporary structural racism, which she calls "new racism", and explores how old ideas about what racism is prevent society from recognizing and fixing the wrongdoings that persist. The author explores a range of examples, from American national identity, to motherhood, to feminine portrayal in hip-hop. Following the Civil Rights Movement, she argues, there was a "shift from color-conscious racism that relied on strict racial segregation to a seemingly colorblind racism that promised equal opportunities yet provided no lasting avenues for African American advancement".

=== Another Kind of Public Education: Race, Schools, the Media and Democratic Possibilities ===
In 2009, Collins published Another Kind of Public Education: Race, Schools, the Media and Democratic Possibilities, in which she encourages the public to be more aware of and prevent the institutional discrimination that African-American children are experiencing today in the public education system. Collins explains that teachers have a great deal of power to be the facilitators of either discriminatory attitudes or tolerant attitudes; they are the "frontline actors negotiating the social issues of our time." Claiming that the education system is greatly influenced by the media, Collins examines racism as a system of power preventing education and democracy to reach its full potential. Within the text, she provides examples of how people, specifically teachers in the education system, can resist colorblind racism to ensure children are provided with safe classroom environments and where they can be guaranteed freedom of expression.

One of the primary concerns in her book is the importance education has in producing citizens and making sure the disenfranchised feel empowered. Within the book, Collins includes personal stories about her position as an African-American child who felt "silenced in Philadelphia's public schools" in order to further elaborate on the important role the education institution has in establishing democracy.

=== Other books ===
Collins co-edited with John Solomos The Handbook of Race and Ethnic Studies (2010), a book on racial and ethnic stratification through an intersectional lens.

In 2012, she published On Intellectual Activism, a collection of personal essays and interviews where she explains how ideas play an important part in bringing about social change.

In 2016 and revised in 2020, Collins also published the book Intersectionality, with co-author Sirma Bilge, which discusses, in depth, the intertwined nature of social categorizations such as race, class and gender, sexuality and nation, and how these ideas create a complex web of discrimination and disadvantage in society. Taking a global perspective, topics covered include the history of intersectionality, critical education, human rights, violence, global social protest, identity politics, and women of color feminism in the United States and Brazil.

In 2023, she published the book Lethal Intersections: Race, Gender, and Violence, which explores how violence differentially affects people according to their class, sexuality, nationality, and ethnicity.

== Career honors ==
Collins is recognized as a social theorist, drawing from many intellectual traditions. She reconceptualizes the ideas of race, class, gender, sexuality and nationalism as interlocking systems of oppression. Her more than 40 articles and essays have been published in a wide range of fields, including philosophy, history, psychology, and most notably sociology. In 2023 she became the first African American woman to be awarded the Berggruen Prize, a $1 Million Prize by the Berggruen Institute awarded annually to a thinker shaping political, economic, and social institutions.

- Faculty of the Year Award at the University of Cincinnati (1991)
- C. Wright Mills Award for the first edition of Black Feminist Thought (1991)
- Distinguished Publication Award by the Association for the Women in Psychology for Black Feminist Thought (1991)
- Letitia Woods Brown Memorial Book Prize by the Association of Black Women Historians for Black Feminist Thought (1991)
- Award for Outstanding Service to African-American Students at the University of Cincinnati (1993)
- Jessie Bernard Award by the American Sociological Association for significant scholarship in the area of Gender (1993)
- Named the Charles Phelps Taft Professor of Sociology by the University of Cincinnati, making her the first-ever African American, and only the second woman, to hold this position (1996).)
- Emeritus Status from University of Cincinnati, Cincinnati, OH, (2005).
- Emeritus Status from University of Maryland, College Park (2018)
- Distinguished University Professor from University of Maryland (2006)
- American Sociological Association Distinguished Scholarly Book Award for her book Black Sexual Politics (2007)
- Morris Rosenberg Award for Student Mentorship from the University of Maryland (2009)
- Doctor of Humane Letters. John Jay College of Criminal Justice, New York, NY. (2009).
- Alumni Achievement Award from the Harvard Graduate School of Education (2011)
- Joseph B. and Toby Gittler Prize her contributions to racial and ethnic relations from Brandeis University (2012)
- Doctor of Humane Letters. Arcadia University, Philadelphia, PA. (2012).
- Doctor of Humane Letters. Duquesne University. Pittsburgh, PA. 2014.
- Doctor of Humane Letters. College of Wooster. Wooster, OH. 2015.
- W.E.B. Du Bois Career of Distinguished Scholarship Award from American Sociological Association (2017)
- Elected to the American Academy of Arts and Sciences, 2022.

== Participation in American Sociological Association ==
Patricia Hill Collins was named an ASA (American Sociological Association) Minority Fellow in the 1980s. She spent two years as chair of the Minority Fellowship program from 1985 to 1988 and chair of the ASA Task Force from 1989 to 1993. In 2008, she became the 100th president of the ASA and the first African-American Woman in the organization's 104-year history. She delivered her presidential address in the 2009 ASA Annual Meeting. Collins work with the ASA, "The New Politics of Community" was published in the American Sociological Review and asserts that community is a dynamic political construct that, containing a plethora of different and contradicting agendas, can be used to evaluate issues of race, sex, and gender. She describes how community can be used for social examination for a number of reasons:

- The commonality of the "language of community", which, interchangeable with words like neighborhood, establishes community as a part of group identity
- Communities are "malleable" and easy to research
- Communities can hold many differing agendas and thus "reflect diverse and conflicting social practices"
- "the construct of community catalyzes strong, deep feelings that can move people to action,"
- "the construct of community is central to how people organize and experience social inequalities".

== Participation in social activism ==
On October 13, 2014, Patricia Hill Collins gave a lecture at DePaul University in Chicago, IL titled, "Charting a New Course: Intersectionality and Black Activism" to a group of 182 university students as well as to other residents of Chicago. In the lecture, Collins discussed activism stereotypes as well as intersectionality and how to use intersectionality to challenge the oppression they may face. She also encouraged the audience to create coalitions and to participate in activism themselves. Additionally, Collins' lecture allowed her audience to think critically about sociological thought and to figure out "what it means to strengthen one's power through ideas."

== Academic responses ==
Collins' influential books on intersectionality and community have led way to many references and responses in sociological spheres. Notably, Professor Shannon Sullivan of the University of North Carolina at Charlotte penned "Community as a Political and Temporal Construct: A Response to Patricia Hill Collins" in The Pluralist. In the article, Sullivan connected the four aspects of a politically constructed community as laid out by Collins with Philosophy Professor Alfred Frankowski. While Sullivan finds Collins' "hope that a political understanding of community could enable genuine change that is not part of a changing-same pattern" to be admirable, she contrasts this with Frankowski's assertion that the memorialization of Anti-Black violence is necessary for white-dominated communities to keep racist agendas in the past. Sullivan ultimately finds that Frankowski's pragmatist philosophy is needed for White America to successfully evaluate the communities in which echo chambers fuel racial ignorance.

== References in other academic spheres ==
Patricia Hill Collins' work has not only been referenced and referred to heavily in sociological circles, but her assertions on intersectionality and the black female experience have also been cited in literary analysis. In 2020, Parvin Ghasemi and Samira Heidari of the Molana Institute of Higher Education in Iran published "Patricia Hill Collins' Black Feminine Identity in Toni Morrison's Beloved" in the Journal of African American Studies. The article describes how Beloved's main character, a mother and former slave in the post-slavery south, epitomizes and subsequently shatters Collins' proposed matrix of domination: "In line with Collin's philosophy, Morrison's novel presents a reaction to matrix of domination. In fact, the multiplicity of experience that Collin refers to can be found in the novel through the fact that readers see simultaneously the experience of being a marginalized, a murderer, a mother, a people of color, a traumatic woman, and a former slave. All these aspects help the collective experience of race disentangle itself from the structural oppression and discrimination. Though Seth is a traumatic figure, this portrayal helps to expose the true picture of a discriminatory society that produces such failing characters."

== Representation of media ==
In 2009, a video from the C-Span website titled "BookTV: Patricia Hill Collins, author "Another Kind of Public Education" Collins takes a visit to "Busboys & Poets", a restaurant/bookstore/theater located in Washington DC and provided an hour and 16 minutes-long "book talk" regarding her book Another Kind of Public Education. As the website describes the video: "Professor Collins posits that public education is heavily influenced by the media and by the continuing influence of institutional racism and she examines ways in which schools perpetuate racism and other forms of social inequality. Professor Collins also read passages from her book and responded to questions from members of the audience."

In 2012, a video from the YouTube website titled "Dr. Patricia Hill Collins Delivers 2012 Graduate Commencement Address", Collins gives the commencement address at Arcadia University on Thursday, May 17, 2012, when she received an honorary doctorate. She provides stories of her past from growing up in Philadelphia, her and her parents' struggles, and being in a school that predominately caters to middle-class white students. She also touches upon breaking her silence and how she came about using her voice as a critical instrument to make social change.

In 2014, a video from the YouTube website titled "Patricia Hill Collins at Grand Valley State University February 2014". Collins gives a talk to undergraduate students from Grand Valley State University in which she expresses her concern of mainstream colorblindness, especially focusing on issues of racial profiling (regarding African Americans) [regarding Trayvon Martin] and tackling other issues regarding race, sex, class, etc. Additionally, Collins reads mini excerpts from her book Black Feminist Thought. The website description is: "On February 26, 2014, Grand Valley State University's Office of Multicultural Affairs, Women's Center and LGBT Resource Center hosted Patricia Hill Collins as part of ongoing Intersections programming. Patricia Hill Collins presented "We Who Believe in Freedom Cannot Rest: Lessons from Black Feminism".

In 2015, Collins visited University of Massachusetts Boston and gave a presentation regarding sociological theory, mainly focusing on intersectionality's challenges and the critical inquiries.

In 2016, Collins alongside Patricia Williams, Robin Morgan, Kate Harding, Polly Toynbee, Arwa Mahdawi, and Suzanne Moore were all asked the following panel question by The Guardian following the defeat of Hillary Clinton by Donald Trump in the 2016 United States Presidential election: "What does the US election result say about misogyny?" In her answer, Collins exclaims: "I am disappointed but I will keep up the fight." She discusses the sadness she feels for Clinton's loss. Additionally, Collins brings one's attention to the idea that to gain social change, Americans must remember they will deal with struggles. Collins leaves the reader on a positive note by saying she believes that America has made progress in being committed to opportunity, equity, civility and fairness. However, she still sees a need to keep fighting to achieve a strong democracy.

On November 21, 2018, Collins gave a keynote lecture on "Intersectionality and Sociology" at the University of Cambridge during the university's 50 Years of Sociology conference. In this lecture, she reflected on her sociology career as well as "discussing critically the intersectional approach and alternative knowledge projects, and returning to the core question that motivates her work: What will it take for Black people to be free?"

In 2022, Collins was interviewed by Gênero e Número where she talked about Black Lives Matter, social justice, and the overturn of Roe v. Wade in the United States. She claims that the "Killing of George Floyd...was very significant in shifting the discussion of that particular social movement to the point where you had people not just in the United States but globally saying we believe in Black Lives Matter and issues related to that." When asked about the overturn of Roe v. Wade in the United States she says, "I think it was really shocking for a lot of young women in the United States that this right was taken away on a federal level, but it wasn't particularly shocking for many of us who never had it in the first place...I think it's been very good for young women to realize that you don't get to keep something that you have, people come and take stuff from you...it's not fair, but that's what power is."

== Legacy ==
In Professor Gurminder Bhambra's 2015 essay "Black Thought Matters: Patricia Hill Collins and the long tradition of African American sociology", Bhambra describes how Collins not only nurtured existing schools of African-American sociology but pushed the field into a new direction. On Collins' 1990 book Black Feminist Thought, Bhambra wrote: "It has been both a scholarly beacon for researchers working through shared ideas and experiences, and an intellectual grounding from which further critical work has been enabled and more voices brought into conversation. Its influence ranges across disciplinary and geographical boundaries and dismantles conventional hierarchies in the process"

In Professor's Elizabeth Higginbotham's 2012 essay "Reflections on the Early Contributions of Patricia Hill Collins," Higginbotham talks about the impact Collins' work had on the interdisciplinary field of women's studies. She believes, "her early work was truly significant in helping other scholars combat the labels of particularism, challenge the language of essentialism in women's studies, and move in ways to demonstrate that our scholarship has much to say about the nature of social life in the United States and the world."

=== Books ===
- Lethal Intersections: Race, Gender and Violence. Cambridge: Polity Press ISBN 978-1-5095-5315-0, 2024
- Intersectionality as Critical Social Theory, Durham: Duke University Press, ISBN 978-1-4780-0646-6, 2019
- (co-authored with Sirma Bilge)Intersectionality, Cambridge, UK: Polity Press, ISBN 9-781509-539680, 2016, 2020
- On Intellectual Activism, Philadelphia: Temple University Press, ISBN 978-1-4399-0961-4, 2012
- (co-edited with John Solomos) The SAGE Handbook of Race and Ethnic Studies, Los Angeles: London: SAGE, ISBN 978-0-7619-4220-7, 2010
- Another Kind of Public Education: Race, the Media, Schools, and Democratic Possibilities, Beacon Press, ISBN 978-0-8070-0018-2, 2009
- From Black Power to Hip Hop: Racism, Nationalism, and Feminism, Temple University Press, ISBN 978-1-59213-092-4, 2006
- Black Sexual Politics: African Americans, Gender, and the New Racism, New York: Routledge, ISBN 978-0-415-93099-4, 2005
- Fighting Words: Black Women and the Search for Justice, University of Minnesota Press, ISBN 978-0-8166-2377-8, 1998
- (co-edited with Margaret Andersen) Race, Class and Gender: An Anthology, ISBN 978-0-534-52879-9, 1992, 1995, 1998, 2001, 2004, 2007, 2010, 2013, 2016, 2020
- Black Feminist Thought: Knowledge, Consciousness and the Politics of Empowerment, Routledge, ISBN 978-0-415-92484-9, 1990, 2000

=== Book chapters ===
- Hill Collins, Patricia (1996), "Black women and the sex/gender hierarchy", in Jackson, Stevi; Scott, Sue (eds.), Feminism and Sexuality: a reader, New York: Columbia University Press, pp. 307–313, ISBN 978-0-231-10708-2.
- Hill Collins, Patricia (1997), "Defining Black feminist thought", in Nicholson, Linda (ed.), The Second Wave: A Reader in Feminist Theory, New York: Routledge, pp. 241–260, ISBN 978-0-415-91761-2.

=== Selected journal articles ===
- "Just Another American Story? The First Black First Family", in Qualitative Sociology 35 (2), 2012: 123–141.
- "New Commodities, New Consumers: Selling Blackness in the Global Marketplace", in Ethnicities 6 (3), 2006: 297–317.
- "Like One of the Family: Race, Ethnicity, and the Paradox of the US National Identity", in Ethnic and Racial Studies 24 (1), 2001: 3–28.
- "The Tie that Binds: Race, Gender, and U.S. Violence", in Ethnic and Racial Studies 21 (5), 1998: 918–938.
- "What's In a Name: Womanism, Black Feminism and Beyond", in Black Scholar 26 (1), 1996: 9–17.
- "The Meaning of Motherhood in Black Culture and Black Mother/Daughter Relationships", in Sage: A Scholarly Journal on Black Woman 4 (2), 1987: 4–11.
- "Learning from the Outsider Within: The Sociological Significance of Black Feminist Thought", in Social Problems. 33 (6), 1986: 14–32.

== See also ==
- Standpoint feminism § Black feminism

Academic offices
Preceded by Arne L. Kalleberg	President of the American Sociological Association; 2009	Succeeded by Evelyn Nakano Glenn
Awards
Preceded by Barbara Katz Rothman	Jessie Bernard Award; 1993; With: Dorothy E. Smith and the Memphis State University Center for Research on Women	Succeeded by Arlene Kaplan Daniels
Preceded by Barbara Katz Rothman	Jessie Bernard Award; 1993; With: Dorothy E. Smith and the Memphis State University Center for Research on Women	Succeeded by Madeline Davis
Preceded by Barbara Katz Rothman	Jessie Bernard Award; 1993; With: Dorothy E. Smith and the Memphis State University Center for Research on Women	Succeeded by Ruth Frankenberg
Preceded by Barbara Katz Rothman	Jessie Bernard Award; 1993; With: Dorothy E. Smith and the Memphis State University Center for Research on Women	Succeeded by Elizabeth Lapovsky Kennedy
