= Standpoint feminism =

Social science theory

Standpoint feminism is a theory that feminist social science should be practiced from the standpoint of women or particular groups of women, as some scholars (e.g. Patricia Hill Collins and Dorothy Smith) say that they are better equipped to understand some aspects of the world. A feminist or women's standpoint epistemology proposes to make women's experiences the point of departure, in addition to, and sometimes instead of men's.

== Overview ==
Dorothy Smith, teaching at University of California, Berkeley, when the women's movement was in its early stages, looked at the experience of female academics and began to ask about life stories of these women. As a feminist inspired by Karl Marx, Smith turned her attention to the development of "a sociology for women". She founded feminist standpoint theory, which looked at the social world from the perspectives of women in their everyday worlds and the ways in which women socially construct their worlds. As theorized by Nancy Hartsock in 1983, standpoint feminism is founded in Marxism. Hartsock argued that a feminist standpoint could be built out of Marx's understanding of experience and used to criticize patriarchal theories. Hence, a feminist standpoint is essential to examining the systemic oppressions in a society that standpoint feminists say devalues women's knowledge. Standpoint feminism makes the case that, because women's lives and roles in almost all societies are significantly different from men's, women hold a different type of knowledge. Their location as a subordinated group allows women to see and understand the world in ways that are different and challenging to the existing male-biased conventional wisdom.

Standpoint feminism unites several feminist epistemologies. Standpoint feminist theorists attempt to criticize dominant conventional epistemologies in the social and natural sciences, as well as defend the coherence of feminist knowledge.

Initially, feminist standpoint theories addressed women's standing in the sexual division of labor. Standpoint theorists such as Donna Haraway sought to show standpoint as the "notion of situated knowledge ... to counter the apparent relativism of Standpoint theory".

This theory is considered to have potentially radical consequences because of the focus on power and the fact that it challenges the idea of an "essential truth", especially the hegemonic reality created, passed down and imposed by those in power.

== Establishing a standpoint ==
There has been agreement between feminist standpoint theorists that a standpoint is not just a perspective that is occupied simply by the fact of being a woman. Whereas a perspective is occupied as a matter of the fact of one's socio-historical position and may well provide the starting point for the emergence of a standpoint, a standpoint is earned through the experience of collective political struggle, a struggle that requires both science and politics. While both the dominant and the dominated occupy perspectives, the dominated are much more successfully placed to achieve a standpoint. However, this is not saying that those who occupy perspectives that are not-marginalized cannot help in reaching a shared critical consciousness with relation to the effects of power structures and epistemic production. For example, much of conventional science research produces knowledge understood through male-biased worldviews that isolate women from their own realities. Only through such struggles can we begin to see beneath the appearances created by an unjust social order to the reality of how this social order is in fact constructed and maintained. This need for struggle emphasizes the fact that a feminist standpoint is not something that anyone can have simply by claiming it. It is an achievement. A standpoint differs in this respect from a perspective, which anyone can have simply by "opening one's eyes".

== Strong objectivity and the relation to feminist standpoint ==
According to Nancy Naples,

The notion of strong objectivity was first articulated by feminist philosopher Sandra Harding. Strong objectivity builds on the insights of feminist standpoint theory, which argues for the importance of starting from the experiences of those who have been traditionally left out of the production of knowledge. By starting inquiry from the lived experiences of women and others who have been traditionally outside of the institutions in which knowledge about social life is generated and classified, more objective and more relevant knowledge can be produced.

Naples also stated that Harding argued that knowledge produced from the point of view of subordinated groups may offer stronger objectivity due to the increased motivation for them to understand the views or perspectives of those in positions of power. A scholar who approaches the research process from the point of view of strong objectivity is interested in producing knowledge for use as well as for revealing the relations of power that are hidden in traditional knowledge production processes. Strong objectivity acknowledges that the production of power is a political process and that greater attention paid to the context and social location of knowledge producers will contribute to a more ethical and transparent result.

Joseph Rouse says,

The first lesson suggested by standpoint theories has not been sufficiently emphasized in the literature. Standpoint theories remind us why a naturalistic conception of knowing is so important. Knowledge claims and their justification are part of the world we seek to understand. They arise in specific circumstances and have real consequences. They are not merely representations in an idealized logical space, but events within a causal nexus. It matters politically as well as epistemically which concepts are intelligible, which claims are heard and understood by whom, which features of the world are perceptually salient, and which reasons are understood to be relevant and forceful, as well as which conclusions credible.

== Black feminism ==
Black feminist thought is a collection of ideas, writings, and art that articulates a standpoint of and for black women of the African diaspora. Black feminist thought describes black women as a unique group that exists in a "place" in US social relations where intersectional processes of race, ethnicity, gender, class, and sexual orientation shape black women's individual and collective consciousness, self-definitions, and actions. As a standpoint theory, black feminist thought conceptualizes identities as organic, fluid, interdependent, multiple, and dynamic socially constructed "locations" within historical context. Black feminist thought is grounded in black women's historical experience with enslavement, anti-lynching movements, segregation, Civil Rights and Black Power movements, sexual politics, capitalism, and patriarchy. Distinctive tenets of contemporary black feminist thought include: (1) the belief that self-authorship and the legitimatization of partial, subjugated knowledge represents a unique and diverse standpoint of and by black women; (2) black women's experiences with multiple oppressions result in needs, expectations, ideologies, and problems that are different from those of black men and white women; and (3) black feminist consciousness is an ever-evolving concept. Black feminist thought demonstrates black women's emerging power as agents of knowledge. By portraying African-American women as self-defined, self-reliant individuals confronting race, gender, and class oppression, Afrocentric feminist thought speaks to the importance that knowledge plays in empowering oppressed people. One distinguishing feature of black feminist thought is its insistence that both the changed consciousness of individuals and the social transformation of political and economic institutions constitute essential ingredients for social change. New knowledge is important for both dimensions to change.

Tina Campt uses standpoint theory to examine the narrative of the Afro-German Hans Hauck in her book Other Germans.

First introduced by Patricia Hill Collins, black feminist standpoint is known to be a collective wisdom of those who have similar perspectives from subordinate groups of society. Collins offers two main interpretations of the consciousness of oppressed groups.

- The first claims that those who are being oppressed identify with the dominant groups and therefore have no effective self-governing interpretation of their own oppression.
- The second approach assumes that the subordinate are "less human" than those above them making them less capable of understanding and speaking of their own experiences. While black women may have common experiences, this does not imply that all black women have developed the same thoughts as one another.

Black feminist standpoint theory aims to bring awareness to these marginalized groups and offer ways to improve their position in society.

Though similar in some ways, black feminist standpoint theory has many differences compared to the original theories of Dorothy Smith and Nancy Hartsock about standpoint theory. Black feminist standpoint argues that the knowledge gained about an individual or other groups in society is gained from multiple factors related to their historical position in society. Black women offer an alternative position that reveals a representation of others from a different perspective. Feminist standpoint theory aims to acknowledge the diversity of women by welcoming the views of other oppressed groups of women.

Unlike those in the privileged social groups, black women have access to knowledge about everyone from the most oppressed to the most privileged. This is due to the fact that certain realities of oppression are invisible to those who are in the dominant groups because they do not experience this oppression in the same way as the oppressed group. The privileged group may be totally unaware of how their actions may affect the subordinate group. Black women, on the other hand, have a better perspective (a different standpoint) from direct experience and can offer suggestions to help other marginalized groups of our society. This standpoint of black women can also be seen as a "bifurcated consciousness", which is the ability to see things both from the perspective of the dominant and from the perspective of the oppressed and, therefore, to see both perspectives.

Not all women, however, have exactly the same experiences. Because of this, there is no singular standpoint of all women. This led to the development of black feminist epistemology. Patricia Hill Collins first introduced the idea of black feminist epistemology saying that it derives from the personal experience of black women dealing with both racism and sexism. She uses this epistemology to empower black women to hold their own control. She describes them as "outsiders within". By this she means that black women have experienced enough from the inside to understand where they lie socially while also having enough distance from the dominant groups to offer a critique.

Heidi Mirza also offers an analysis of black feminist standpoint theory saying that new dialogues are formed out of the unique perspective of black feminist women. Mirza recognizes that black women are sometimes known as the "other" and offers her term saying they have a status as a "third space" between the margins of race, gender, and class. Mirza suggests that in this space, there is "no official language and discourse. Because of this, black women are put in the position of 'active agents' and are responsible to share their perspective and offer new insights."

It was not until the latter part of the 1990s that there was more of a focus on black women. A number of both films and published works by and about black women began to emerge. This marked an important transition from years past when the only works to be published or put on screen were those of more dominant groups. The only works of black women that are recognized previous to this time are those from the early part of the nineteenth century. The works of Mary Prince (1831) and Mary Seacole (1837) are the more commonly known writings today. Aside from those few, the next notable published work was not until Sylvia Wynter (1962) and Maryse Condé (1988), leaving a gap of over 120 years of little to no work of black women. This gap shows how powerless black women were in a market position. Although we see more and more work of black women in our society today, there still remains a lack of control and limited input over their works; it must be confined to certain areas in order for them to have any opportunity and publication.

== Criticism ==
Criticism of standpoint feminism has come from postmodern feminists, who argue that there is no concrete "women's experience" from which to construct knowledge. In other words, the lives of women across space and time are so diverse it is impossible to generalize about their experiences. Standpoint feminism has absorbed this criticism, to an extent (see below).

== Contemporary standpoint feminism ==
Many standpoint feminists now recognize that because of the many differences that divide women it is impossible to claim one single or universal "women’s experience". Because sexism does not occur in a vacuum, it is important to view it in relation to other systems of domination and to analyze how it interacts with racism, homophobia, colonialism, and classism in a "matrix of domination".

Contemporary standpoint feminist theory perceives that it is "a relational standpoint, rather than arising inevitably from the experience of women" (see difference feminism). Standpoint feminists have recently argued that individuals are both oppressed in some situations and in relation to some people while at the same time are privileged in others. Their goal is to situate women and men within multiple systems of domination in a way that is more accurate and more able to confront oppressive power structures. This is also known as kyriarchy. One of the critiques of this stance is that such an intense focus on the many differences between women obliterates the very similarities that might bond women together. If this is that case, trying to create a broad-based feminist community or building consensus on specific policy becomes difficult.

== See also ==
- Cultural feminism
- Marxist feminism
- Material feminism
- Third-wave feminism
