= Mitwelt =

Mitwelt is a German term used in existential therapy to refer to an individual's social or cultural environment. Problems in the mitwelt center on integration vs. isolation, or individuality vs. conformity. The individual is tasked with the responsibility to achieve a balance between these opposing states in order to derive existential meaning from a social group while maintaining one's autonomy.

The mitwelt (social dimension) is one of four existential dimensions. The others include: Umwelt (physical dimension) Eigenwelt (psychological dimension), and Überwelt (spiritual dimension).
