= Black Sexual Politics =

2004 book

- Author: Patricia Hill Collins
- Language: English
- Subject: African-American culture
- Genre: Critical theory
- Publisher: Taylor and Francis
- Publication date: 2004
- ISBN: 9780415951500

Black Sexual Politics: African Americans, Gender and the New Racism by Patricia Hill Collins is a work of critical theory that discusses the way that race, class and gender intersect to affect the lives of African American men and women in many different ways, but with similar results. The book explores the way that new forms of racism can work to oppress black people, while filling them with messages of liberation.

Black Sexual Politics also examines the way a narrow sexual politics based on American ideas/ideals of masculinity, femininity and the appropriate expression of sexuality work to repress gay and hetero, male and female. Collins' work also proposes a liberatory politics for black Americans, centered on honest dialogue about the way stereotypical imagery and limiting racist and sexist ideology have harmed African Americans in the past, and how African Americans might progress beyond these ideas and their manifestations to become active change agents in their own communities.

== Chapters ==
- Chapter 1: Why Black Sexual Politics
- Chapter 2: The Past Is Ever Present: Recognizing the New Racism
- Chapter 3: Prisons for Our Bodies, Closets for Our Minds: Racism, Heterosexism and Black Sexuality
- Chapter 4: Get Your Freak On: Sex, Babies, and Images of Black Femininity
- Chapter 5: Booty Call: Sex, Violence, and Images of Black Masculinity
- Chapter 6: Very Necessary: Redefining Black Gender Ideology
- Chapter 7: Assume the Position: The Changing Contours of Sexual Violence
- Chapter 8: No Storybook Romance: How Race and Gender Matter
- Chapter 9: Why We Can't Wait: Black Sexual Politics and the Challenge of HIV/AIDS

== Summary ==
The book starts from the premise that in order to achieve a more progressive black political agenda, African Americans need to look critically at the way race, class and gender intersect in their lives to create different responses. Looking at the black community as a monolith may prevent us from seeing that African American women are the targets of specific social welfare policies or that African American men are being disproportionately incarcerated. Both of these results stem from racism, but take on a gendered approach.

In Black Sexual Politics, Hill Collins proposes several ideas for black liberation, though the book is focused on getting individuals to find creative ways to challenge racism, sexism and homophobia as it manifests itself in their own communities. One idea that Hill Collins purports is that African Americans need to create and support avenues of self-expression that allow them to tell their own stories about the effects of racism/sexism/homophobia, and to share their emotional and sexual experiences as African American persons. This work is being done, but is largely in its infancy.

Hill Collins also argues that it is critical for African Americans to define new visions of success that resist traditional Western/American views. She argues that equating masculinity with wealth and femininity with submissiveness and financial dependence is harmful to all groups, but especially for African Americans, who have been traditionally locked out of the economic opportunity structure. In a society where black men face threats to their economic well being, and disproportionately are incarcerated and lack access to quality education, any vision of masculinity that suggests that to be a man is to be financially successful puts a great number of black males at odds. Collins argues for a new, more holistic version of success, that includes visions of the importance of personal character apart from economic achievement.

Hill Collins argues that there needs to be a culture of honesty in the black community, whereby black persons can express their ideas and identities in a whole way. If we do not create the space for black people to express their sexual perspectives freely, then we create a space where the silence and deceptiveness that leads to the spread of HIV/AIDS to continue. When we can discuss sexuality from multiple perspectives, we allow people the space to talk about sex and sexuality and feel more comfortable engaging their partners in dialogues about their own sexual history, sexual feelings, and lead to STD testing and full appreciation and connection of one another.

== LGBT ==
In Black Sexual Politics, Collins expresses the view that the black community will not reach its progressive political agenda, nor will it be able to successfully address social issues such as the HIV/AIDS crisis affecting the black community, if it does not allow marginalized voices like women and LGBT persons to express their perspectives and lifestyles. Collins believes that a group cannot be truly revolutionary or progressive if it works to oppress others. She also believes that a view of the black community that values some identities and expressions over others limits the connectedness that others in that community feel, and prevents issues disproportionately affecting them to be discussed in meaningful ways.

She argues that a narrow black sexual politics that places extreme value on limiting views of the role of the male and the role of the female, and also on the role of appropriate and socially acceptable sexual behavior works to deny LGBT people their agency, and prevents honest dialogue about different types of sexual lifestyles. This can work to the oppression of LGBT people, but also of heterosexual women and men, oppressed by views of sexuality that limit their sexual expression, and thus limit the space for them to talk about their lifestyles in a way that breeds honesty, self-affirmation and prevents the spread of disease.

== Reviews ==
According to reviews of the book, Collins found importance in taking a deep analysis of sexuality and racism on a global level, using a collection of materials curating history, empirical research, cultural studies, and her keen awareness of social, cultural, and political affairs. She alludes to the stain that was left by racist practices of segregation and exclusion and its legacy pertaining to the evolution of the 21st century. In addition, she addresses the influence that increasing global wealth and power has on the imagining of both racialized and gendered bodies.

== See also ==
- Misogyny in hip hop culture
- From Black Power to Hip Hop: Racism, Nationalism, and Feminism
