= Dorothy E. Smith =

British-Canadian sociologist (1926–2022)

Dorothy E. Smith CM
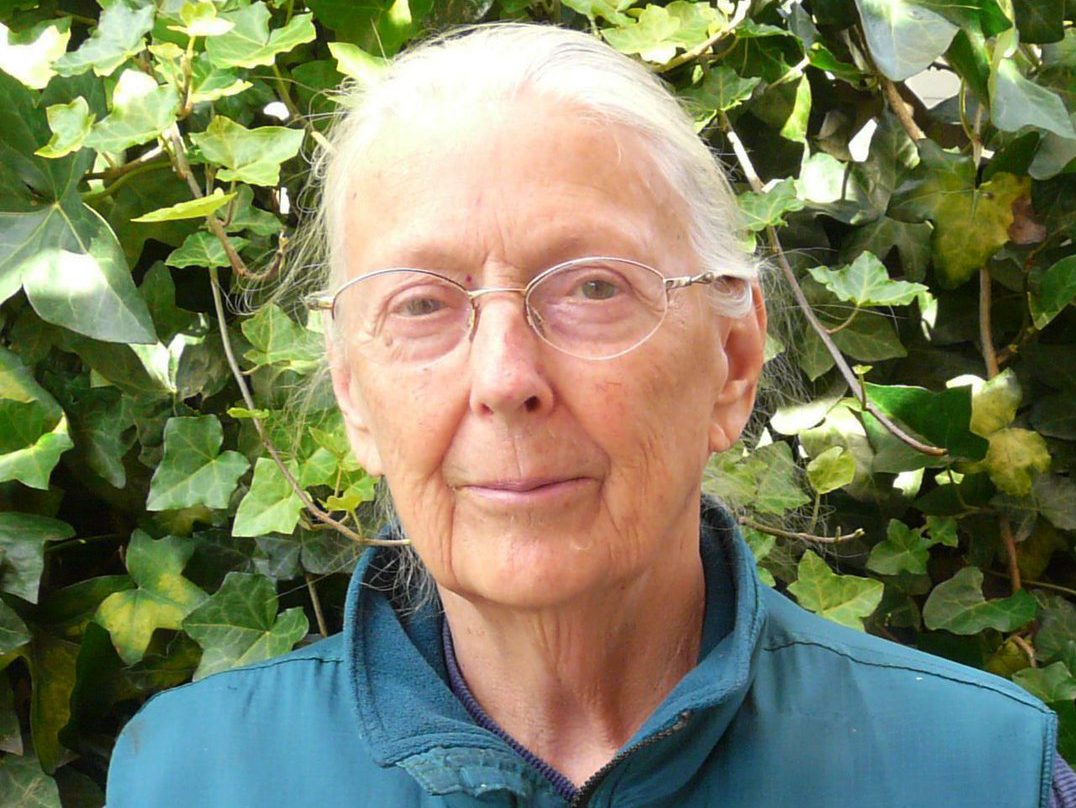
- Born: Dorothy Edith Place; 6 July 1926; Northallerton, North Riding of Yorkshire, England
- Died: 3 June 2022 (aged 95); Vancouver, British Columbia, Canada

Academic background
- Education: University of California, Berkeley; London School of Economics

Academic work
- Main interests: Feminist studies, sociology, educational studies, social anthropology, psychology, ethnography
- Notable works: Institutional Ethnography: A Sociology for People; The Conceptual Practices of Power: A Feminist Sociology of Knowledge; The Everyday World as Problematic: A Feminist Sociology
- Notable ideas: Institutional ethnography, ruling relations, feminist standpoint theory, bifurcation of consciousness

Dorothy Edith Smith CM (née Place; 6 July 1926 – 3 June 2022) was a British-born Canadian ethnographer, feminist studies scholar, sociologist, and writer with research interests in a variety of disciplines. These include women's studies, feminist theory, psychology, and educational studies. Smith was also involved in certain subfields of sociology, such as the sociology of knowledge, family studies, and methodology. She founded the sociological sub-disciplines of feminist standpoint theory and institutional ethnography.

== Biography ==
Smith was born on 6 July 1926 in Northallerton, North Riding of Yorkshire, England, to Dorothy F. Place and Tom Place, who had her and three sons. Her mother was a university-trained chemist who had been engaged in the women's suffrage movement as a young woman, and her father was a timber merchant. One of her brothers, Ullin Place, was known for his work on consciousness as a process of the brain, and another was poet Milner Place.

At the age of twenty-five, Smith entered the work force as a secretary in the book publishing industry, but this left her wanting more. After this realization, Smith completed her undergraduate degree at the London School of Economics, earning her B.Sc. in sociology with a major in social anthropology in 1955. She then married William Reid Smith, whom she had met while attending LSE, and they moved to the United States. They both attended graduate school at the University of California, Berkeley, where she received her Ph.D. in sociology in 1963, nine months after the birth of their second child. Not long afterward she and her husband were divorced; she retained custody of the children. She then taught as a lecturer at UC Berkeley from 1964 to 1966. Smith started teaching sociology and was the only female teacher in a faculty of 44.

Following the divorce, Smith was lacking in day care and family support while trying to raise her two children alone. As a result, she decided to move back to England in the late 60s. While she was there, she gave lectures on sociology at the University of Essex, Colchester. In 1968, Smith moved with her two sons to Vancouver, British Columbia to teach at the University of British Columbia, where she helped to establish a Women's Studies Program. In 1977 Smith moved to Toronto, Ontario to work at the Ontario Institute for Studies in Education, where she lived until she retired. In 1994 she became an adjunct professor at the University of Victoria, where she continued her work in institutional ethnography. Smith served on the international advisory board for the feminist journal Signs.

Smith died of complications due to a fall at her home in Vancouver on 3 June 2022, at the age of 95.

== Inspiration ==
=== Familial Influence ===
Dorothy Smith came from a long line of feminist activists. Each of these familial figures had an impact on Smith's sociological theories and ideas. Most notably were Margaret Fox, Lucy Ellison Abraham, and Dorothy Foster Place.

Margaret Fox née Fell was the feminist leader of the 17th century Quaker movement. Often referred to as the "mother of Quakerism" she opened her home to be used as one of the first headquarters for the Quaker religious Society of Friends. Lucy Ellison Abraham and Dorothy Foster Place were Dorothy Smith's grandmother and mother respectively. Both were members of the Women's Social and Political Union (WSPU) and engaged in militant suffrage activism. Abraham participated mostly in the organizational and office work, while Place was more active, even getting arrested once during a window breaking campaign.

Smith's own identity as a Marxist-feminist developed during the 1970s, when her life history and the ongoing women's movement merged to contribute to her life and sociological practices. The Vancouver Women's Movement from 1968 to 1977 proved to be a key moment in the development of Smith's identity. The combination of Smith's feminist ancestry and her own experiences in women's movements went on to shape her standpoint theory. Taking into account how the influential female figures in her life addressed feminism and gender inequality, Smith was able to compile her experiences into a theory. Smith's standpoint theory argues that the origin of standpoint came from women's experiences as housewives. Each of her three ancestors were housewives and that added to and shaped their approach to feminism and activism.

=== Outside Influence ===
Smith had influential ties to theorists such as Karl Marx and Alfred Schütz. Building on top of Marxist theory, Smith evolved alienation into gender-stratified capitalism, explaining in her work Feminism and Marxism how "objective social, economic and political relations ... shape and determine women's oppression". From Schutz, Smith explains, "Individuals are experienced as 'types'", developing upon his concept of umwelt and mitwelt relations. In The Everyday World as Problematic: A Feminist Sociology, Smith explains mitwelt and umwelt relations of male dominance claiming, "women's work conceals from men the actual concrete forms on which their work depends". Smith was also influenced by George Herbert Mead after taking one of his classes, as well as Maurice Merleau-Ponty, after stumbling upon one of his books.

== Adopted ideologies ==
=== Connection to Marxism ===
Smith took on a similar mindset as Karl Marx, founder of Marxism. She took a similar approach of Marxism and applied it to feminism. One of the papers written by Smith, draws upon Marx's ideologies. In the paper, "The Ideological Practice of Sociology", Smith explains the distinction between ideology and social science, taking upon some of Marx's ideas. Furthermore, Smith gave a talk relating to "feminism and Marxism". In the talk, she spoke about how her feminist distinctiveness developed through Marxism. The idea that not all standpoints are viewed equally shows how Smith's take on standpoint theory also draws direct connections with Marxism. This inequality in standpoints and how they are perceived in society reflects Marxist ideas of the impact of social, economic, and political relations on shaping and determining oppression. Before Smith, American feminist theorist Sandra Harding conducted the 1986 study, The Science Question in Feminism, which created the concept of standpoint theory in order to emphasize the knowledge of women, arguing that hierarchies naturally created ignorance about social reality and critical questions among those whom the hierarchies favored. However, those at the bottom of these ladders had a perspective that made it easier to explain social problems.

=== Bifurcation of consciousness ===
Bifurcation is defined as dividing or separating into two parts or branches. Smith argued that there is a split between the world that an individual actually experiences and the dominant view that one is supposed to adapt, in this case being the male-dominated view. In the case of the bifurcation of consciousness, specifically related to standpoint theory, this refers to the separation of the two modes of being for women. Since sociology is a male-dominated field, women must fight to push past their expected roles as housewives and mothers, moving from the local realm of the home to the "extra local" realm of society. Women, therefore, split their consciousness in two in order to establish themselves as knowledgeable and competent beings within society and the field of sociology.

=== Umwelt and Mitwelt ===
Umwelt can be described as the world around us. It is on a more intimate level like such as a husband and wife. Mitwelt is the with-world for instance Mitwelt relations refer more to a type of relation, such as an individual and their mail carrier. Alfred Schütz describes mitwelt relationships as less intimate than umwelt relationships. Smith extends these concepts by demonstrating how umwelt is more "central in women's lives, and men relegate their umwelt relations to women". Meaning, women tend to have more intimate relationships that men.

== New contributions ==
=== Standpoint theory ===
Standpoint theory is rooted in the idea that what one knows is impacted by their position in society. It also contains three main beliefs: no one can have complete and objective knowledge, no two people can have exactly the same standpoint, and we must not take for granted our own standpoint. Smith emphasized the importance of recognizing our standpoint and utilizing it as the entry point to our investigation. Her overall goal with standpoint theory was to fully account for the perspectives of different genders and their effects on our reality.

During her time as a graduate student in the 1960s, Smith developed her notion of standpoint, shaping Harding's theory. During this time, Smith recognized that she was experiencing "two subjectivities, home and university", and that these two worlds could not be blended. In recognition of her own standpoint, Smith shed light on the fact that sociology was lacking in the acknowledgment of standpoint. At this point, the methods and theories of sociology had been formed upon and built in a male-dominated social world, unintentionally ignoring the women's world of sexual reproduction, children, and household affairs. Women's duties are seen as natural parts of society, rather than as an addition to culture. Smith believed that asking questions from a woman's perspective could provide insight into social institutions. Smith determined that for minority groups, the constant separation between the world as they experience it versus continually having to adapt to the view of the dominant group creates oppression, which can lead to members of the marginalized group feeling alienated from their "true" selves. Smith compared the women's experience to the women's standpoint, and believed that women's oppression was grounded in male control. The idea that women shared a method in their experiences with oppression was enforced by Smith.

=== Example ===
Smith often used one particular story as an example of the importance of standpoint theory, and as a way of explaining it:

One day, while riding in a train in Ontario, Smith observed a family of Indians standing together by a river, watching the train pass by. It was only after having made these initial assumptions that Smith realized that they were just that; they were assumptions, assumptions that she had no way of knowing if they were true or not. She called them "Indians", but she couldn't have known, for sure, what their origins were. She called them a family, which could have very well not been true. She also said they were watching the train go by, an assumption that emerged solely based on her position in time and space, her position riding in the train, looking out at the "family".

For Smith, this served as a representation of her own privilege, through which she made assumptions and immediately imposed them on the group of "Indians". It helped lead her to the conclusion that experiences differ, across space, time, and circumstance. It is unfair to create society—and ruling relations—based on only one point of view/being.

=== Institutional ethnography ===
Institutional ethnography (IE) is a sociological method of inquiry which Smith developed, created to explore the social relations that structure people's everyday lives. For the institutional ethnographer, ordinary daily activity becomes the site for an investigation of social organization. Smith developed IE as Marxist feminist sociology "for women, for people"; it is now used by researchers in the social sciences, in education, in human services and in policy research as a method for mapping the translocal relations that coordinate people's activities within institutions. Smith insisted that her outline of Institutional ethnography would be expanded upon in a collaborative manner amongst sociologists, emphasizing the networking needed to progress the idea.

Smith uses the example of the everyday act of walking her dog to show how a benign act can actually be used for sociological investigation. She claims that in walking her dog and allowing it to do its business on some lawns, but not others actually reaffirms the class system. In choosing which lawns are acceptable or not for her dog she is reaffirming the differences in forms of property ownership.

In her work on sociology for women, Smith spent time attempting to show that the standpoint of women has been historically excluded from aspects of life related to professional ruling. Meaning managing, organizing, and administering. Here Smith highlights how important it is to investigate how the everyday worlds we live in are shaped by the institutions that surround us. In this case Smith defines institutions as complex, functional organizations, in which many forms and groups are interwoven. Institutional processes then particular actions into standardized and generalized forms. Smith draws on Marx's discussion of commodity relations: when goods and services are exchanged in the market setting, their value appears in the form of money. In a similar way, bureaucratic forms of organization make actions accountable in terms of abstract and generalized categories.

=== Lecture video ===
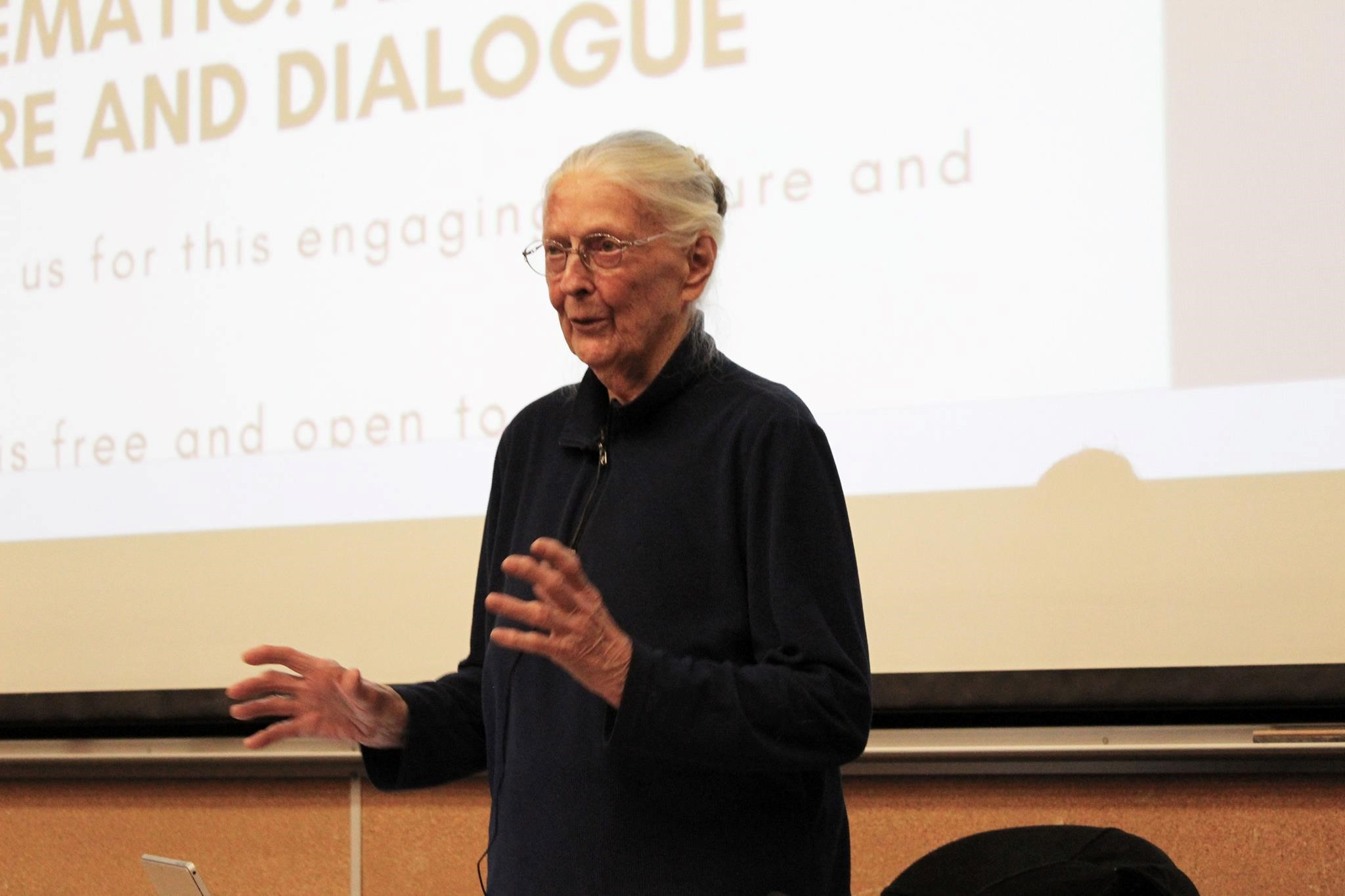
Smith giving a lecture at the University of Toronto.

Smith gave a recorded lecture introducing her work and thoughts on institutional ethnography. This lecture was hosted at the Dalla Lana School of Public Health on November 5, 2018.

== Documentary sociology ==
Alongside her development of institutional ethnography and standpoint theory, Smith constructed what several scholars have called a documentary sociology: a systematic theoretical account of how documents, records, forms, and files constitute social reality rather than merely describing it. The program draws on Harold Garfinkel's ethnomethodological concept of the documentary method of interpretation—the process by which members treat particular observations as evidence of an underlying pattern while using that pattern to interpret new observations—and extends it from individual cognition to the level of institutional organization.

Smith's foundational statement appears in "The Social Construction of Documentary Reality" (1974), where she argues that institutional facts are not given properties of events but practical accomplishments produced through processes of reporting, categorization, and inscription. Institutional documents—case files, assessment forms, discharge summaries, eligibility records—do not represent pre-existing social realities; they actively constitute them. Once completed, the interpretive labor that produced a record disappears behind its apparent facticity, and the document circulates as an authoritative account that directs future institutional action.

This analysis connects directly to Smith's concept of institutional personhood, sometimes called the documentary person. Institutions do not act upon living individuals in their full complexity; they act upon documentary persons—entities assembled through prior rounds of categorization, inscription, and filing. Smith argued that documentary realities become "more consequential institutionally than lived realities themselves." The gap between the documentary person and the living person is not a bureaucratic error but a structural feature of any system that must coordinate action across multiple sites and actors through records rather than direct contact.

In "K Is Mentally Ill: The Anatomy of a Factual Account" (1978), Smith demonstrated documentary constitution through close analysis of a conversational account in which a woman describes a mutual acquaintance's behavior to a friend. Rather than asking whether K is in fact mentally ill, Smith analyzed how the account produces that recognition—tracing the rhetorical operations of authorized positioning, biographical reconstruction, the disqualification of alternative explanations, categorical redescription, and the suppression of disjuncture through which potentially contradictory evidence is absorbed into a seamless factual narrative. The paper showed that documentary constitution is not a specialized bureaucratic skill but a general practical competence deployed in everyday accountable talk.

Smith's concepts of active texts and textually mediated social organization, developed in "Textually Mediated Social Organisation" (1984) and Texts, Facts, and Femininity (1990), extend this framework to the coordination of institutional action across dispersed sites. Active texts are not passive information repositories; they direct reader conduct at the moment of use. An intake form organizes the encounter through which a client is assessed; a policy manual directs rather than merely describes organizational procedure; a case file activates institutional responses to the documentary person it has constituted. Smith described the interactional unit through which this occurs as a text-reader conversation: institutional workers are simultaneously engaged with the person before them and with the categorical demands of the documentary system they must satisfy. Through these mechanisms, institutions achieve what Smith called translocal coordination—the alignment of actions among people who are never co-present, through texts that carry institutional logic wherever they travel.

Smith later collaborated with Catherine F. Schryer to develop the concept of documentary society in "On Documentary Society" (2003), arguing that the governance of contemporary social life has become so thoroughly organized through documentary systems—databases, reporting requirements, standardized assessments, accountability metrics—that the term describes a defining feature of the social formation itself, not merely of particular institutional domains.

Although these contributions are analytically distinct from Smith's work on standpoint epistemology and feminist methodology, scholars have argued they represent the intellectual core of her sociological project and constitute one of the most systematic early accounts in sociology of how documentary practices reproduce ruling relations.

=== Bibliography entries to add ===
- Smith, Dorothy E. (1974). "The Social Construction of Documentary Reality". Sociological Inquiry. 44 (4): 257–268. doi:10.1111/j.1475-682X.1974.tb00718.x.
- Smith, Dorothy E. (1978). "K Is Mentally Ill: The Anatomy of a Factual Account". Sociology. 12 (1): 23–53. doi:10.1177/003803857801200102.
- Smith, Dorothy E. (1984). "Textually Mediated Social Organisation". International Social Science Journal. 36: 59–75.
- Smith, Dorothy E. (1990). Texts, Facts, and Femininity: Exploring the Relations of Ruling. London: Routledge. ISBN 978-0415102445.
- Smith, Dorothy E. (2005). Institutional Ethnography: A Sociology for People. Lanham, MD: AltaMira Press. ISBN 978-0759105010.
- Smith, Dorothy E.; Schryer, Catherine F. (2003). "On Documentary Society". In Bazerman, Charles; Russell, David R. (eds.). Writing Selves/Writing Societies. Fort Collins, CO: The WAC Clearinghouse.
- Mellinger, Wayne Martin (2026). Abandonment in Real Time: Institutional Recognition and Premature Death Among the Homeless. New York: Routledge.

=== Ruling relations ===
Smith also developed the concept of ruling relations, the institutional complexes that "coordinate the everyday work of administration and the lives of those subject to administrative regimes". This allows a society to have control and organization, with examples being systems of bureaucracy and management. It also defines how they will interact with one another. Smith argues that ruling relations dehumanize people. She focuses on how it can limit women to only being seen in their traditional roles of mother, wife, homemaker, or housekeeper.

== Professional recognition/awards ==
While Smith's early essays were influential in the emergence of sex and gender education in sociology, her work is neglected by other sociologists. However, in recognition of her contributions in the "transformation of sociology", and for extending the boundaries of "feminist standpoint theory" to "include race, class, and gender". Smith received numerous awards from the American Sociological Association, including the American Sociological Association's Career of Distinguished Scholarship Award (1999) and the Jessie Bernard Award for Feminist Sociology (1993). In recognition of her scholarship, she also received two awards from the Canadian Sociological Association and the Canadian Anthropological Association; the Outstanding Contribution Award (1990) and the John Porter Award for her book The Everyday World as Problematic: A Feminist Sociology (1990). In 2019, she was named as a member of the Order of Canada.

Her work is ranked among the most important produced in 20th and 21st Century sociology, and it has been suggested that Institutional Ethnography should be considered a contemporary classic.

== The Everyday World as Problematic: A Feminist Sociology (1987) ==
Smith wrote Everyday World as a Problematic: A Feminist Sociology. The book is a series of six essays that touch upon her ideas of social life, feminist theory, Marxism, and phenomenology. Her concept of the line of fault is the notion of recognizing the male biases as a society and being conscious from a woman's perspective and noticing the inequality between male and female. In Toronto, while teaching at Ontario Institute of Studies, Smith published her paper about everyday lives as a woman, and the sociology behind the everyday housewife and mother. Her work intended to create a sociology for women, as this is a male dominated field. Smith wanted to create a field of sociology that questioned the everyday problems of life.

== Selected quotes ==
"A sociology is a systematically developed consciousness of society and social relations." — Dorothy Smith

"Most people do not participate in the making of culture." — Dorothy Smith

"The institutionalized practices of excluding women from the ideological work of society are the reason we have a history constructed largely from the perspective of men, and largely about men." — Dorothy Smith

== Selected works ==
- Simply Institutional Ethnography: Creating a Sociology for People (2022, ISBN 978-1487528065)
- Institutional Ethnography: A Sociology for People (2005, ISBN 978-0759105010)
- Mothering for Schooling, co-author with Alison Griffith (2004, ISBN 978-0415950534)
- Writing the Social: Critique, Theory, and Investigations (1999, ISBN 978-0802043078)
- The Conceptual Practices of Power: A Feminist Sociology of Knowledge (1990, ISBN 978-1555530808)
- Texts, Facts, and Femininity: Exploring the Relations of Ruling (1990, ISBN 978-0415102445)
- The Everyday World as Problematic: A Feminist Sociology (1987, ISBN 978-1555530365)
- Feminism and Marxism: A Place to Begin, A Way to Go (1977, ISBN 978-0919888715)
- Women Look at Psychiatry: I'm Not Mad, I'm Angry—Collection edited by Smith and David (1975, ISBN 978-0889740006), Press Gang Publishing
- Sociological Theory Vol.10 No.1: Sociology from Women's Experience: A Reaffirmation (1992)
- What It Might Mean to Do a Canadian Sociology: The Everyday World as Problematic (1975)
