= Canadian Research Institute for the Advancement of Women =

Canadian non-profit organisation

The Canadian Research Institute for the Advancement of Women (CRIAW) is a Canadian not for profit, charitable organization founded in 1976 which provides research to the public about relevant feminist issues. CRIAW is the only Canadian research institute focusing on feminist issues and making research accessible to all groups and individuals. Since its inception forty years ago, CRIAW has ensured that the realities faced by all women are acknowledged and respected, and in turn, the experiences of these women have been used in order to bring about social change and equality for all women.

== History of CRIAW ==
1975, known as International Women's Year, brought attention to the fact that there was little research available on women, and that the research which did exist was sexist. March of that year, in Ottawa, Ontario, 16 community members, from diverse backgrounds and occupations, formed a small organization as a platform to meet regularly and discuss this problem. It was through these conferences that the necessity of a women's research institute was realized. In April 1976, representatives from various Canadian organizations were invited to a two-day conference in Ottawa. After careful planning and deliberation, the election of board members, and the adoption of a constitution, the Canadian Research Institute for the Advancement of Women was founded.

=== CRIAW's objectives ===
Following its formation, CRIAW set out a list of goals and objectives:

- Promoting the advancement of women through feminist and women-centered research
- Encouraging and facilitating communication and information exchange among female academics, women's groups, workers, and activists
- Disseminating research results through publications
- Sponsoring and assisting research of interest to women and by women in Canada

During CRIAW's first annual conference in Winnipeg, Manitoba, an appeal for funding was sent to the Minister responsible for the Status of Women. This funding was to ensure that the organization could keep its commitment to embracing the diverse community of Canada by providing service in both official languages. This funding was ultimately granted, and since then, CRIAW has remained active in serving the community in both English and French. However, from 2006 to 2017, funding from Status of Women Canada, CRIAW's main funding source, was cut completely.

=== Early years and initiatives ===
Shortly after being founded, one of CRIAW's first initiatives was to gather adequate funding to conduct its research. This funding came in the form of small membership fees, donations, and provisions by the Association of Universities and Colleges of Canada and the Social Science Federation of Canada. Then, in 1979, CRIAW received enough operational funding to carry out its work. 1980 and 1981 brought about even more change for CRIAW, when funding tripled by the Women's Program, Secretary of State, leading CRIAW to invest in adequate office space, a larger staff, and more services for members. CRIAW continues to recognize outstanding contributions to feminist research annually, along with feminist writers and researchers.

The CRIAW Papers, one of CRIAW's notable early works, was a series of publications exploring feminist theory, analysis, policy, and the history of the women's movement. Specific topics of discussion include, Canadian feminist-pacifists and the Great War, Canada's early women writers, sexism in research and its policy implications, and the experience of shared custody in Canada. Feminist Perspectives, another of CRIAW's notable works, was a series of essays covering topics such as child care, Meech Lake Accord, and pornography. Both of these publications are still used by professors and students, activists, and researchers. Aside from these publications, CRIAW also began producing newsletters four times a year in 1981, and published its first Proceedings in 1982. Before this, papers from CRIAW's conferences were published in Atlantis and Resources for Feminist Research.

Along with written publications, CRIAW sponsors annual conferences featuring prominent members of the community where research and artwork are presented, and workshops are conducted. Some cities where these conferences have been held include Vancouver, British Columbia; Yellowknife, Northwest Territories; and Halifax, Nova Scotia. The themes of these conferences differ each year, but all of these conferences have increased the visibility of women in research, and helped researchers and interest groups work towards improving the status of women.

During its first decade, CRIAW initiated the Bank of Researchers, a database of feminist researchers, and the Title Word Index, a reference tool for finding recent, relevant articles. Both of these projects have enabled researchers to easily access information and find the necessary references to conduct their own work.

CRIAW has always been actively seized in working with other women's organizations to achieve gender equality. For example, in 1977, the President of the National Action Committee on the Status of Women, Kay McPherson, collaborated with CRIAW, hoping that a conjunction of research and action would help improve the position of women in Canada. CRIAW has used its findings to critique various policies and decisions made in Canada, such as those of the Canadian Radio-television and Telecommunications Commission, the Macdonald Commission, and the Federal Task Force on Child Care.

=== Expansion and other projects ===
After expanding its network across Canada, several independent projects were undertaken to spread CRIAW's message on an international scope. In 1985 and 1986, CRIAW presidents Marie Lavigne and Linda Christiansen-Ruffman served as the organization's representatives in Nairobi, Kenya. Furthermore, member Marilyn Assheton-Smith was invited by the United Nations Educational, Scientific, and Cultural Organization (UNESCO) to meet in Paris, France, to discuss a network of feminist research institutes. CRIAW further went on to carry out a pilot project for UNESCO on "Women's Involvement in Political Life".

Following CRIAW's involvement with UNESCO, the organization took on an activist role in research, and began dealing with issues affecting women in northern Canada, such as in Yellowknife and other parts of the Northwest Territories. These initiatives by CRIAW aligned with their non-discriminative mission of serving and assisting women of all cultures and backgrounds and was the foundation to the later development of Intersectional Feminist Frameworks (IFF). Some research topics included women and violence, development, disability, and ethno-cultural communities.

== Current work ==
CRIAW is currently in the process of undertaking new and innovative projects. One important recent project is Intersectional Feminist Frameworks (IFF). Intersectionality refers to the interconnected nature of various types of oppression, and how diverse women may face multiple forms of discrimination. In feminist theory, this has led to consideration of various aspects of identity (age, race, sex, social class, sexual orientation or gender identity, religion, physical or mental ability) by activists and researchers, when studying the different types of discrimination. This has also insisted on further investigation of the larger forces and structures (colonialization, capitalism, immigration system, legal system, education system etc.) in exploring these aspects of identity and experiences. Intersectionality involves the analysis of discrimination in its many forms, and how these many forms intersect with each other and engage with discussions surrounding experiences of discrimination and inequality. An intersectional research approach has specified the importance of recognizing women's experiences with discrimination as being diverse, rather than homogeneous. Two publications by CRIAW, Intersectional Feminist Frameworks - A Primer, and Intersectional Feminist Frameworks - An Emerging Version effectively explain intersectionality and its impact on the feminist movement. The twenty-five publications currently available on CRIAW's website deal with various topics in intersectional feminist research.

Another project undertaken by CRIAW was FemNorthNet, a five-year long initiative which focused on how economic development in northern Canada affects communities culturally, economically, and socially, particularly for women. FemNorthNet releases several newsletters throughout the year, along with articles, fact sheets, and other publications which draw upon the experiences faced by northern women during this period of immense innovation and development.

Changing Public Services was a project funded by the Social Sciences and Humanities Research Council (SSHRC). This research project was conducted to ensure that diverse women can inform and influence the government at federal, provincial, and municipal levels about their needs and access to public services. The goals of this project involve exploring what is changing in public services, how these changes and how public services are impacting diverse women, and what actions can be made in response to these changes. Research was conducted in four regional clusters, Ottawa, Halifax, Saskatoon, and Vancouver, and was scheduled to take place over three years.

CRIAW's mandate is to make resources accessible for diverse women and provides several research articles for free access on their website. Some of this research focuses on subjects such as, women with disabilities, Aboriginal women, and women's health. As well, CRIAW releases a newsletter several times during the year, with reports, articles on global women's issues, and on upcoming projects for the organization. CRIAW's work involves engaging women of all age groups, backgrounds, and demographics, to provide comprehension and awareness of the experiences of all types of women. This engagement is formulated through research, writing, artwork, and discussion.
