= The Story Teller (painting) =

1937 painting by Amrita Sher-Gil

- Artist: Amrita Sher-Gil
- Year: 1937
- Medium: Oil on canvas
- Dimensions: 59 cm (23 in); 79 cm diameter (31 in)

The Story Teller, or The Story, is a 1937 oil painting on canvas by Hungarian-born Indian artist Amrita Sher-Gil (1913–1941). In September 2023 it set a record as the highest-priced Indian artwork sold at auction globally. Blending elements of both Pahari and Parisian influences, the painting depicts a group of village women occupied by ordinary tasks such as chewing betel nut and waving a fan, unconcerned about their surroundings, while a baby cow is seen nosing its way among them. A woman is seated on a traditional bed, engaged in storytelling with the women seated on the floor. Set in an open courtyard, a man stands at the periphery looking across at them.

Between 1935 and 1941, Sher-Gil painted mainly in India. Following her 1937 tour of South India she produced a more classical art style with her South Indian trilogy of paintings Bride's Toilet, Brahmacharis, and South Indian Villagers Going to Market. It made her popular, though she felt her work was largely misunderstood. Criticised for portraying a dark side of India, she was simultaneously praised for bringing to the forefront the issue of women and poverty. The trilogy had tired her out and her next set of paintings would be smaller, including The Story Teller, considered by Sher-Gil herself to be one of her 12 most significant pieces.

The painting was first displayed as The Story in the successful solo exhibition in November 1937 at Faletti's Hotel in Lahore, British India. There, one art critic described her work as simple and modern. It was bought by Badruddin Tyabji. Art historian and critic Deepak Ananth felt that Sher-Gil was "opting for a less grandiose, more relaxed attitude to her Indian subjects". He described the women "not as tragic figures, but as individuals who possessed awareness of their fate and the ability to rise above it".

== Background ==
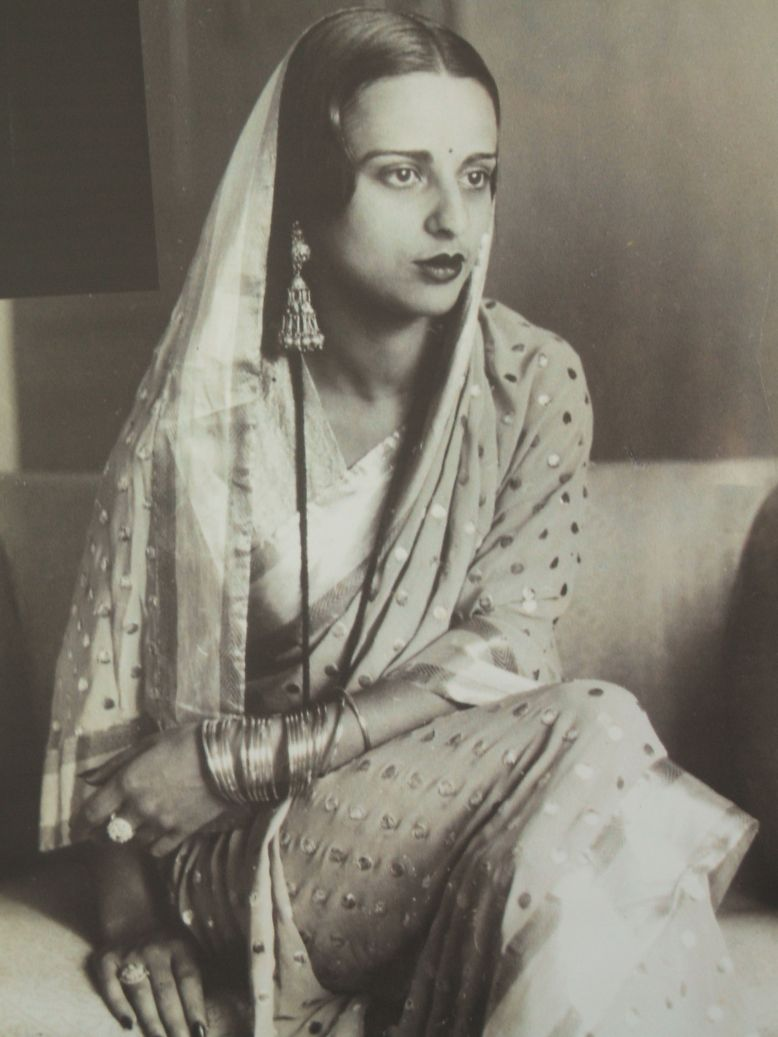
Amrita Sher-Gil

Amrita Sher-Gil (30 January 1913 – 5 December 1941) was a Hungarian-Indian painter who was declared one of India's 'National Art Treasure' artists by the Archaeological Survey of India in 1976. Under the Antiquities and Art Treasures Act (1972) Sher-Gil's works in India can never be exported out of the country. She was the first Asian artist to win a gold medal in painting at the Ecole des Beaux Arts in Paris. Art critic Richard Bartholomew noted her to have played a significant role in shaping the authentic voice and vision of modern Indian painting.

Between 1935 and 1941, Sher-Gil painted mainly in India, where she travelled to exhibit and sell her paintings. She painted in Simla, where her parents lived, in Saraya, Gorakhpur, where her family owned a sugar factory, and in Amritsar and Lahore. Following her 1937 tour of South India which included a visit to the Ajanta Caves, she produced a more classical art style with her South Indian trilogy of paintings Bride's Toilet, Brahmacharis, and South Indian Villagers Going to Market. She became popular, though she felt her work was largely misunderstood. The paintings reveal her sense of color and empathy for her Indian subjects, who are often depicted in their poverty and despair. Criticised for portraying a dark side of India, she was simultaneously praised for bringing to the forefront the issue of women and poverty. The trilogy had tired her out and her next set of paintings, including The Story Teller, would be smaller.

Sher-Gil herself chose The Story Teller as one of her top 12 most significant pieces, and is widely regarded as one of her most sincere and expressive compositions. Some of her other renowned female portraits include Young Girls (1932), Three Girls (1935), Hill Women (1935), and Women on the Charpai (1940).

== Composition ==
External image
- The Story Teller, 1937, oil on canvas, Private collection

The Story Teller is an oil painting on canvas, a figurative art measuring 59 cm by 79 cm. It was painted in October 1937, following Sher-Gil's tour of South India, and in the same month that her sister Indira married Kalyan Sundaram. Her signature and the date October 1937 can be seen in the bottom right corner.

The painting blends elements of Pahari and Parisian influences. At the centre is a group of village women cosily occupied by ordinary tasks such as chewing betel nut and waving a fan, unconcerned about their surroundings, while a baby cow is seen nosing its way among them. A woman is seated on a traditional bed, engaged in storytelling with the women seated on the floor around her. There is also another cow. Set in an open courtyard, a man stands looking over them from behind a doorway.

Sher-Gil herself wrote to Karl Jamshed Khandalavala that this painting was among her recent works "lovely as colour". She told him that she found it "very soothing" painting the cows. It was within this artwork that she had first ventured into the realm of depicting animals, a creative choice that soon became a recurring theme in her artistic repertoire.

== Responses ==
The painting was one of 33 of Sher-Gil's works displayed at her solo exhibition at Faletti's Hotel in Lahore, British India, held from 21 to 27 November 1937. Between 1 March and 26 April 1970 it was exhibited at the Rabindra Bhawan, Delhi.

Charles Fabri, an art critic for the Civil and Military Gazette and present at the 1937 Lahore exhibition was quoted as saying that "Miss Sher-Gil's oeuvre is essentially modern without being fantastic. Simplification and the grasping of important essentials are the key-note in most of her work and there is a certain quality of decorativeness in most of her canvases. Her most fascinating subjects are women and children."

Art historian and critic Deepak Ananth felt that Sher-Gil was "opting for a less grandiose, more relaxed attitude to her Indian subjects". He described the women "not as tragic figures, but as individuals who possessed awareness of their fate and the ability to rise above it". Subodh Gupta notes "The Story Teller is one of Amrita Sher-Gil's most significant works. It portrays women, a common theme in her art, reflecting her indomitable spirit and dedication to her craft which has left an indelible mark on Indian art history. This makes her a cherished national treasure, a symbol of empowerment and someone whose work ushered in profound social change.” Indian sculptor Neeraj Gupta calls the painting "an honest and empathetic portrayal much like the artist herself".

== Sales record ==
The Story Teller was bought by Badruddin Tyabji in 1937 at the Lahore exhibition. On 19 September 2023 Sher-Gil's The Story Teller was featured in Saffronart's Evening Sale: Modern Art, alongside over 70 works by celebrated artists including M. F. Husain, Vasudeo S. Gaitonde, Jamini Roy, and F. N. Souza. It achieved a notable auction price of Rs 61.8 crore, equivalent to $7.45m, to set a record as the highest-priced Indian artwork sold at auction globally as of September 2023. The Hindu noted that between 2010 and 2020 work produced by women accounted for approximately 2% of the near two hundred billion dollars spent at art auctions, and responded to the record as faring "well for women artists who are often left out of the top billing monopolised by male artists the world over". Previously, the most expensive Indian artwork ever sold at auction was Sayed Haider Raza's acrylic on canvas Gestation (1989), selling for ₹51.75 crore at Pundole Auction House on 31 August 2023, seven years after his death.

== See also ==
- List of paintings by Amrita Sher-Gil
