= The Little Girl in Blue =

1934 painting by Amrita Sher-Gil

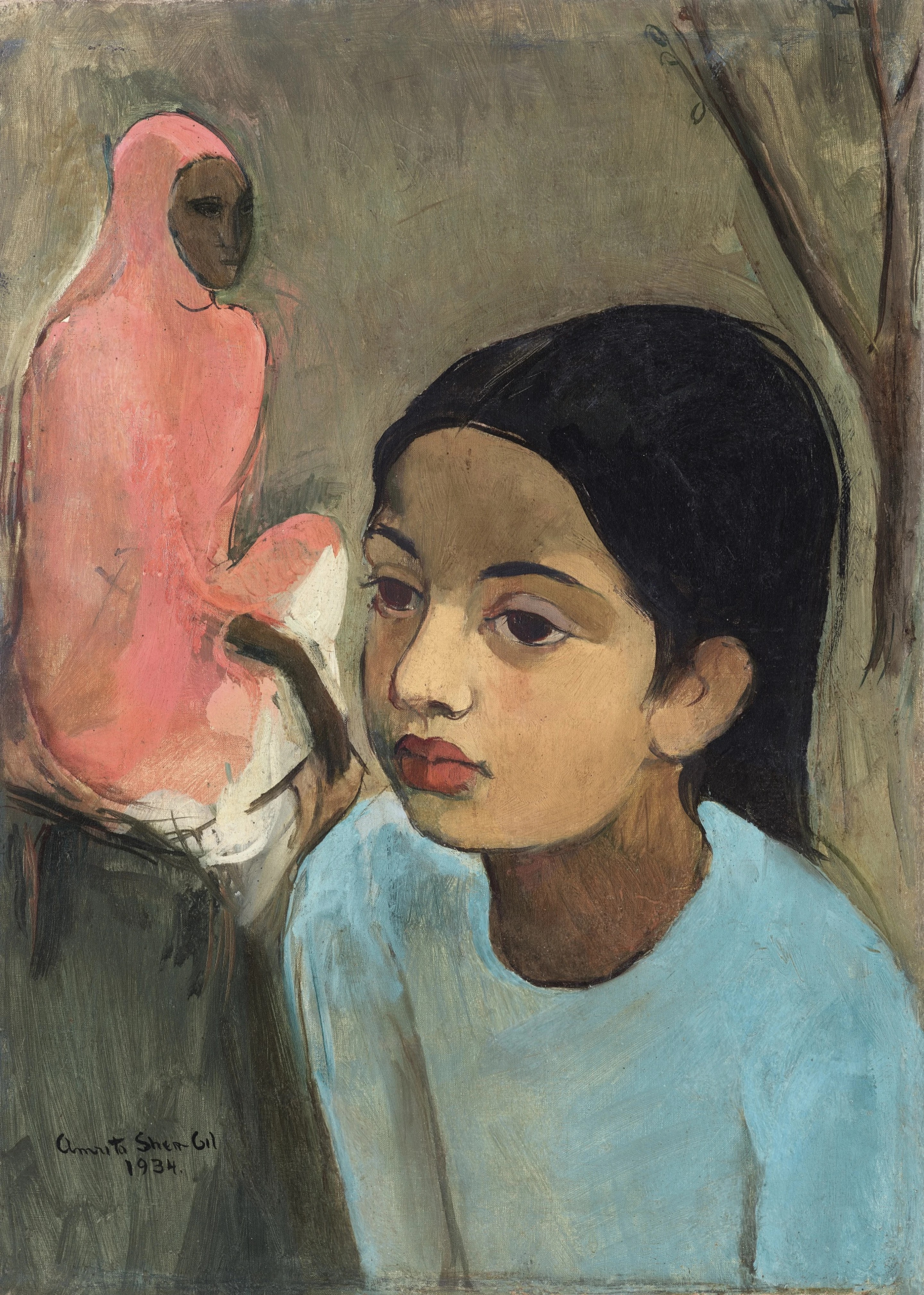
- Artist: Amrita Sher-Gil
- Year: 1934
- Medium: Oil on canvas
- Dimensions: 48 cm × 40.6 cm (19 in × 16.0 in)

The Little Girl in Blue is an oil painting on canvas created in 1934 near Amritsar, India, by Hungarian-Indian artist Amrita Sher-Gil (1913 – 1941). Under India's Antiquities and Art Treasures Act (1972), the work is a national art treasure and must stay in the country. In 2018, it was auctioned by Sotheby's, Mumbai, fetching US$2.67 million.

Sher-Gil spent her childhood in Hungary and India, and her later teens in France, before returning to India towards the end of 1934. In December of that year, she visited her family's ancestral home near Amritsar, and painted Lalit Kaur Mann, an eight-year-old girl who lived across the road. The painting depicts the girl wearing striking blue clothing and staring into space. It has been seen as Sher-Gil's transition from Paris, where blues and greens were typical, to India, where she worked with more reds and browns.

Mann's mother disliked the painting, seeing it as not a true likeness of her daughter. The painting was subsequently one of 33 of Sher-Gil's works displayed at her successful solo exhibition at Faletti's Hotel in Lahore, British India, held in 1937. It was priced at ₹150 and acquired by the Hungarian art critic Charles Fabri, and remained in his family.

== Amrita Sher-Gil ==
Amrita Sher-Gil (1913–1941) was born in Hungary to an Indian aristocrat, Umrao Singh Sher-Gil, and his Hungarian wife, an opera singer. After the First World War, the family moved to India. She spent part of her childhood in Shimla. There, she was influenced by her uncle, Ervin Baktay, who introduced her to Nagybánya artistic methods and plein air painting. He encouraged her to carefully observe the reality around her and transfer it to her work, particularly using live models. In 1929, at the suggestion of Baktay, the family moved to Paris so that 16-year-old Sher-Gil could study art, first at the Académie de la Grande Chaumière and later the Beaux-Arts de Paris. Her mentors included Pierre Henri Vaillant and Lucien Simon. In 1933, she was awarded the Paris Salon's gold medal, for the painting Young Girls. By this time, she had longed to work with more colour and return to India. She moved back to India towards the end of 1934, discarded her European clothes, and took to wearing saris.

== Subject and composition ==
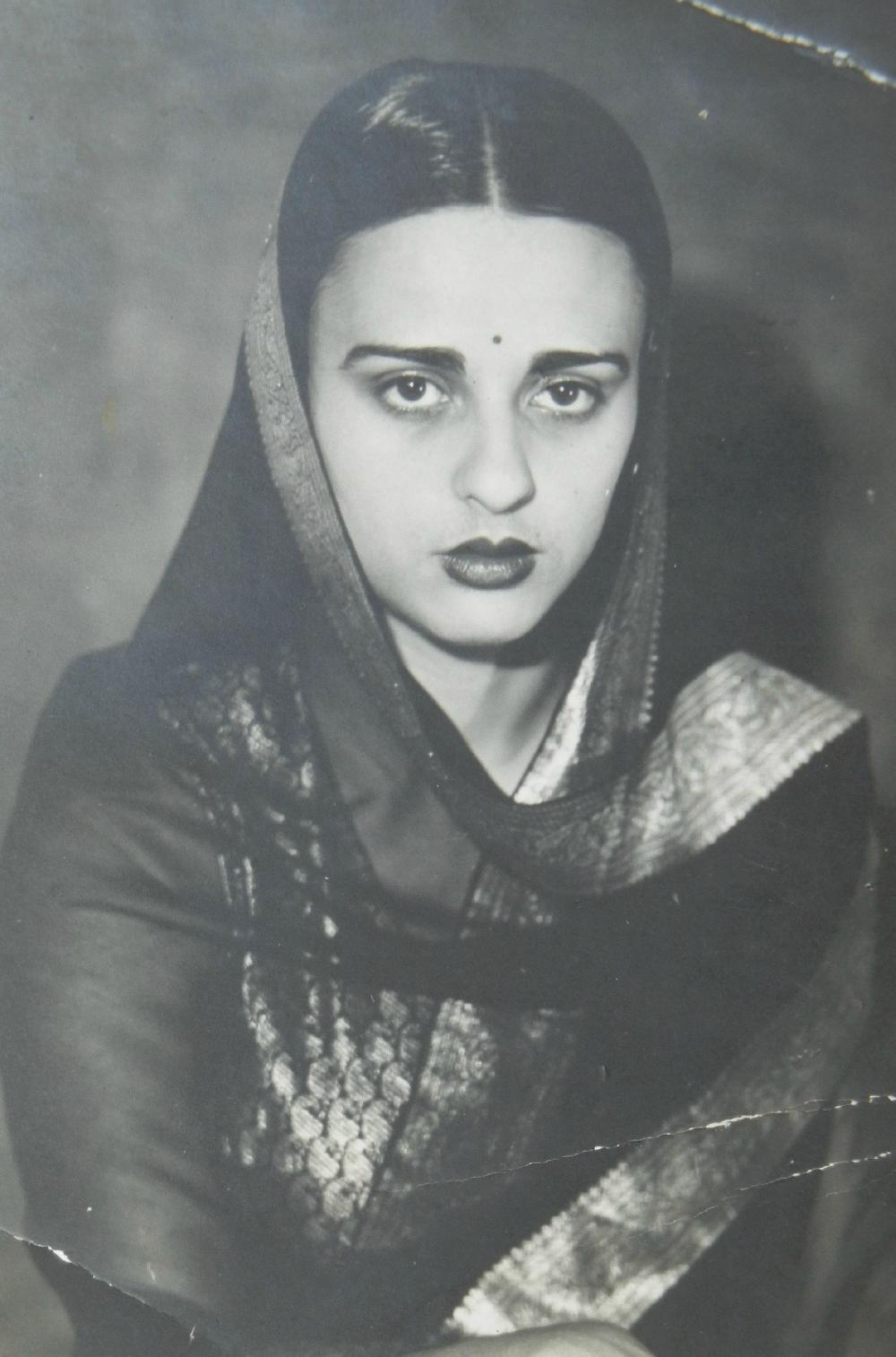
Amrita Sher-Gil in a sari

In 1934, Sher-Gil was staying with her uncle Sunder Singh Majithia at the family's ancestral home, Majitha Palace, near Amritsar. There, in December of that year, she painted The Little Girl in Blue in the garden of the house opposite. It was modelled on the eight-year-old daughter of Mahinder Kaur and the colonel Sir Buta Singh. (Note: Two of Mahinder Kaur's sisters had married into the Sher-Gil family. Harbanso married two of Umrao Singh's sons by his first marriage, first to Satyavan and later to Vivek. Another sister, Persin Kaur, married his nephew, Gurbachan Singh.) The Tribune and Sotheby's clarify that her name is Lalit Kaur Mann, nicknamed Babette, who lived across the road. (Note: Some sources incorrectly name the little girl as Babit, a cousin of Sher-Gil.) Mann's maternal grandfather, Sir Jogendra Singh, and Sher-Gil's father were good friends, had summer and winter residences near each other, and it was usual to visit each other's homes. Mann said in an interview with cultural editor of Mint, Radhika Iyengar:

My father, Col. Sir Buta Singh, entertained a lot (of guests) and the house was always full of visitors. Children kept away from grown-ups those days, but we had heard about Amrita, so we were quite curious as she seemed mysterious and different. I remember her always wearing a sari or a long dark skirt with a blouse. My mother, Lady Buta Singh (Mahinder Kaur), was a great friend of Amrita's. She spent most afternoons at our Nowshera House. Her family home, Majitha House, was just across the road and she used to just walk over. One day, Amrita told my mother that she wanted to paint me. My mother agreed.

Mann recalled that she could not stop fidgeting, and Sher-Gil kept asking her to "sit still!". The painting depicts her wearing striking blue and staring into space. Her slicked-back, thick black hair exposes her ear, and her closed lips are red and full in body. It is set on a background of Amritsar's natural parkland and has an older woman in pinkish, positioned at the back towards the left; added at a later date. The date and Sher-Gil's signature are seen at the lower left of the painting.

== Reception ==
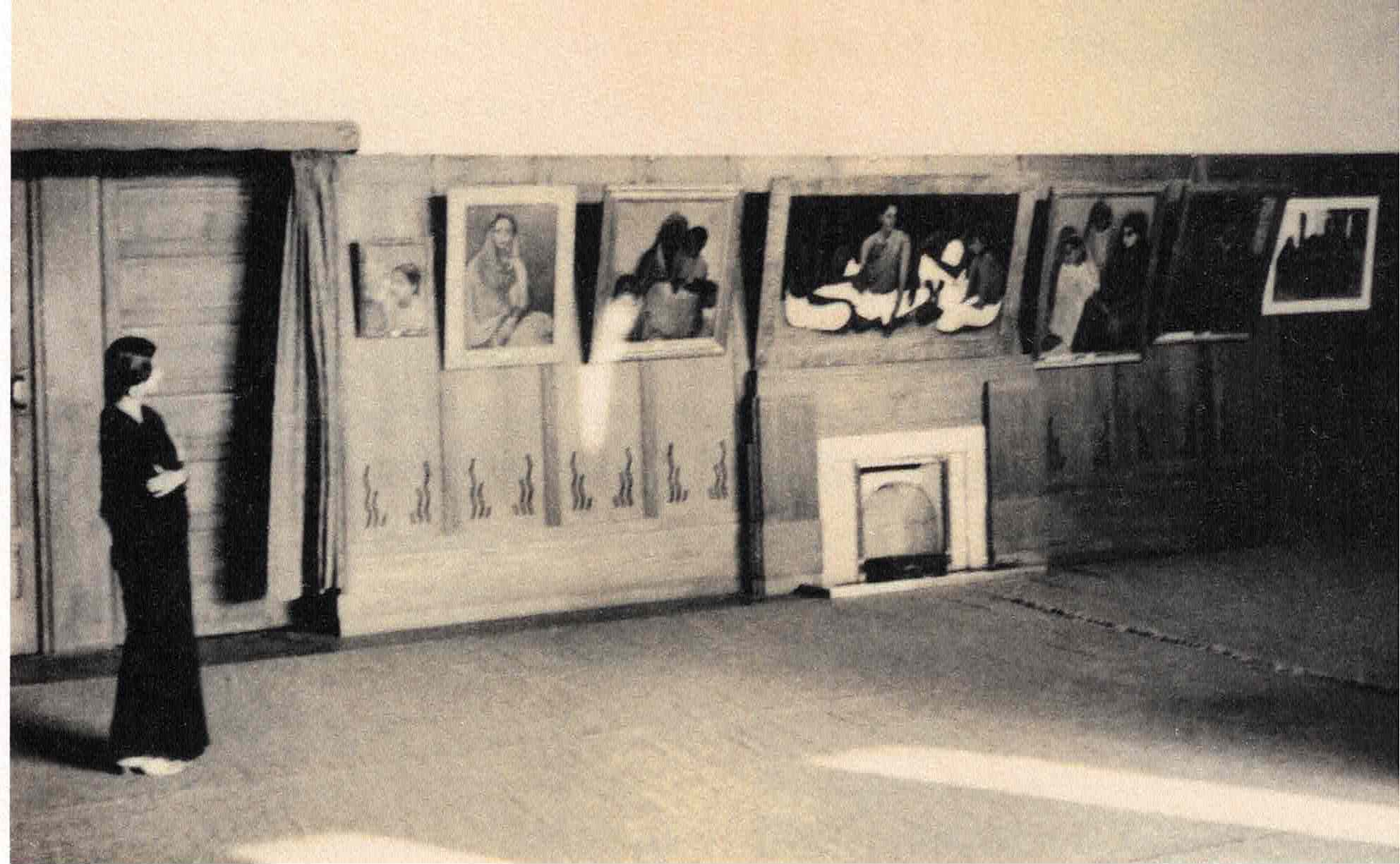
Amrita Sher-Gil at her 1937 opening of her Lahore Exhibition, with The little Girl in Blue

Mann's mother disliked the painting, seeing it as not a true likeness of her daughter. She asked for it to be painted over. Mann recalled "mummy didn't like it at all. She asked Amrita to take the portrait with her and paint over it if she wanted". According to artist Tyeb Mehta, had she thought it "pretty enough" she might have bought it.

The painting was subsequently number 12 of 33 of Sher-Gil's works displayed at her solo exhibition at Faletti's Hotel in Lahore, British India, held from 21 to 27 November 1937. The exhibition catalogue records an asking price of ₹150. Charles Fabri, an art critic for the Civil and Military Gazette and present at the Lahore exhibition was quoted as saying in general that "Miss Sher-Gil's oeuvre is essentially modern without being fantastic. Simplification and the grasping of important essentials are the key-note in most of her work and there is a certain quality of decorativeness in most of her canvases. Her most fascinating subjects are women and children." In an essay he wrote after her death, he called her a "miraculous marriage of Indian and Western, brought up in the discipline of western painting, suffused in her mental make-up with Indian feeling and attitudes".

Art historian Yashodhara Dalmia notes that "the colour blue made an impact with its rich, translucent hues". This she felt was part of the transition from Paris, where blues and greens were typical, to India, where she soon dropped those tones with the introduction of more reds and browns, as seen in her subsequent painting Three Girls.

Sotheby's called the painting a combination of "diverse visual cultures of Europe and India. Stylised and powerful in its presentation ... the work is both unequivocally modern and decidedly Indian at the same time".

== Ownership and conservation ==
With the assistance of Diwan Chaman Lall, the painting was sold to Fabri at the Lahore exhibition of 1937 and thereafter remained in his family. In November 2018 it became the third of Sher-Gil's paintings to be sold by auction in India. It fetched ₹18.69 crore, or US$2.67 million, through auction at Sotheby's, Mumbai. At the time of sale the painting was generally in good state of conservation, though the edges were rubbed by the frame. There was slight unevenness of pigment with evidence of retouching, particularly of the girl's hair and clothing. The faces appeared spared from manipulation.

The work is a national art treasure under India's Antiquities and Art Treasures Act (1972). As such, it must remain in India and may only leave the country with permission from the Indian Central Government.

== See also ==
- List of paintings by Amrita Sher-Gil

== Bibliography ==
- Dalmia, Yashodhara (2013). Amrita Sher-Gil: A Life. Gurugram: Penguin Books. ISBN 978-0-14-342026-2.
- Sundaram, Vivan (2010). Amrita Sher-Gil: A Self-Portrait in Letters and Writings. Vol. 1. New Delhi: Tulika Books. pp. 1–417. ISBN 978-81-89487-59-1.
- Sundaram, Vivan (2010). Amrita Sher-Gil: A Self-Portrait in Letters and Writings. Vol. 2. New Delhi: Tulika Books. pp. 418–821. ISBN 978-81-89487-59-1.
