= Amrita Sher-Gil's paintings at Lahore (1937) =

1937 exhibition of Amrita Sher-Gil's paintings at Lahore

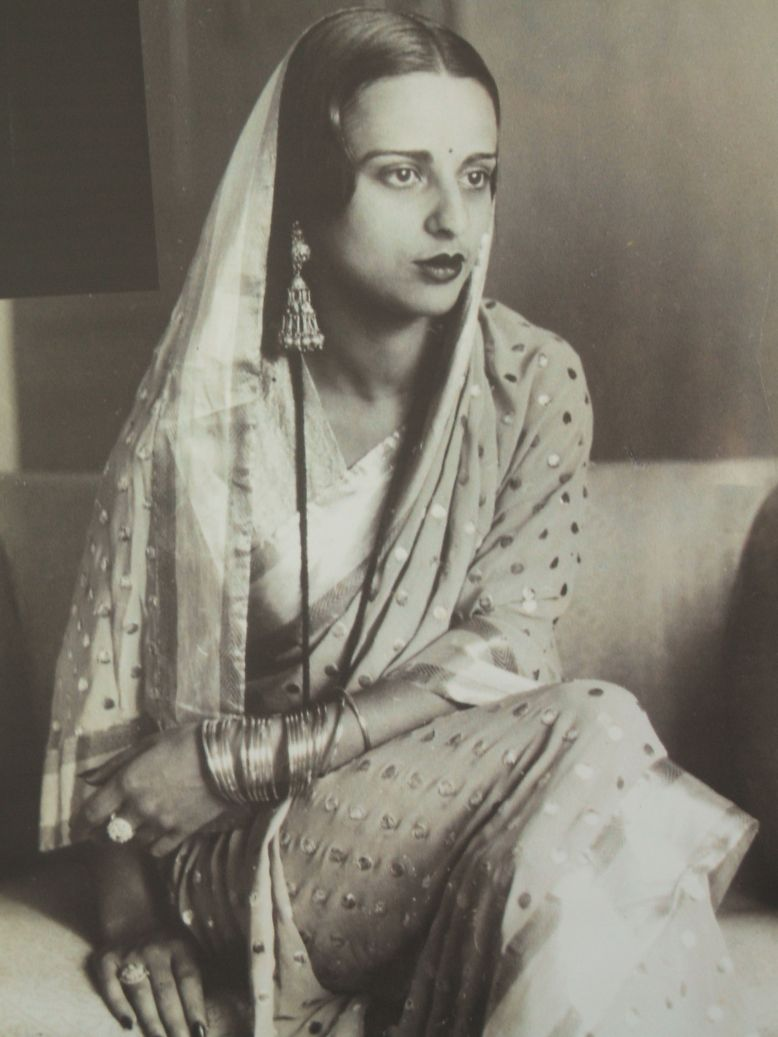
Amrita Sher-Gil

The Hungarian-Indian artist Amrita Sher-Gil, exhibited 33 of her paintings at her One-man Show in the ballroom at Faletti's Hotel in Lahore, British India, held from 21 to 27 November 1937. Four paintings were sold in total; The Little Girl in Blue (1934), The Story (1937), Pink Self-portrait, and The Vina Player (1937).

At the opening, Punjab's finance minister, Manohar Lal, praised the self-portrait she did not like. Charles Fabri commended the exhibition in general, though criticised the show for being too ornate. The attendance was good. With eight annas per entry, the exhibition made around ₹25 a day from entrance fees alone.

== Preparation ==
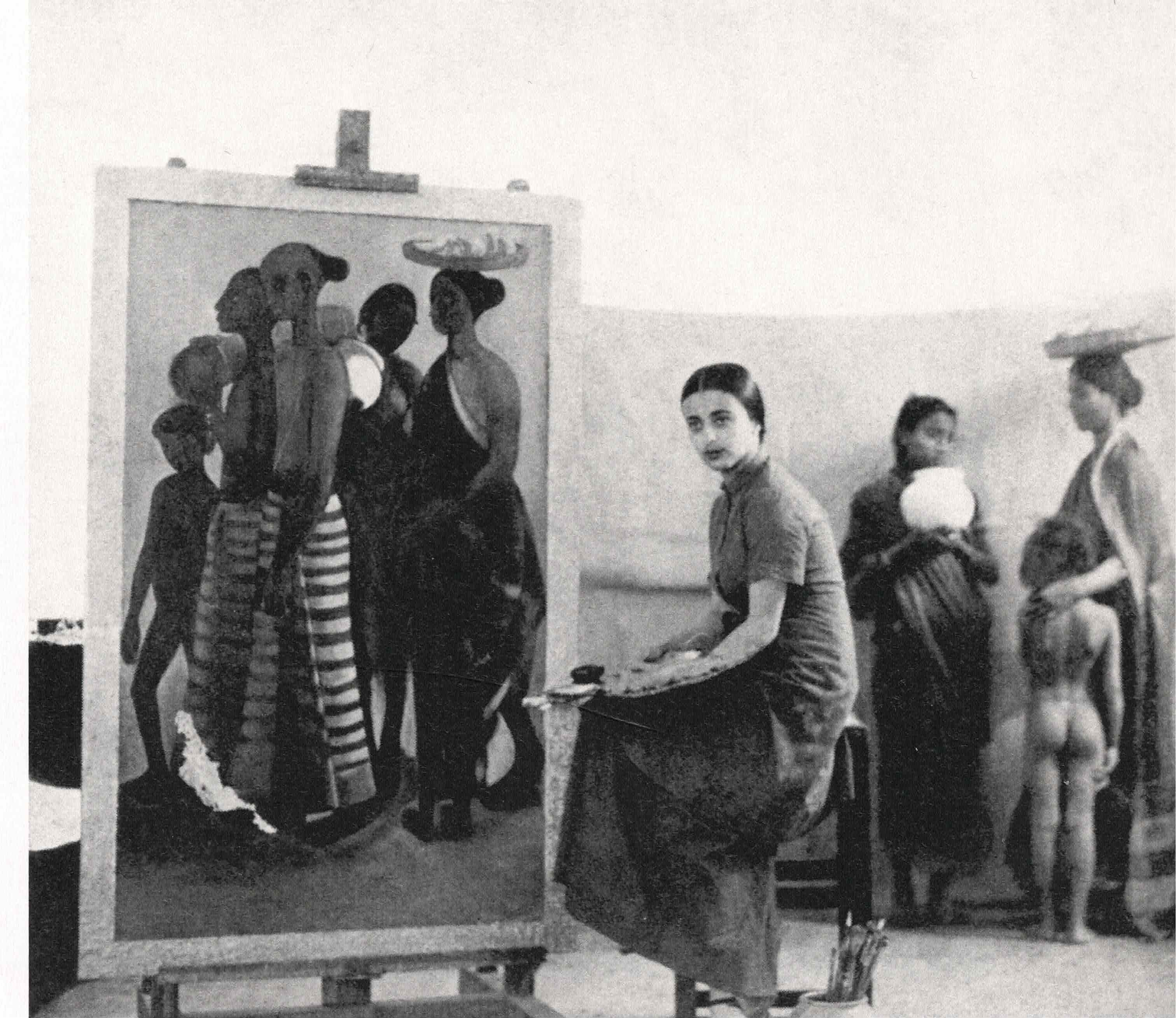
Amrita Sher-Gil painting South Indian Villagers going to Market with three of its models, photographed in 1937 at her home in Simla.

Amrita Sher-Gil exhibited 33 of her paintings, dubbed her "One-man Show", in the ballroom at Faletti's Hotel in Lahore, British India, held from 21 to 27 November 1937. Having checked into Faletti's a week before the opening, she arranged invitations, oversaw plans for lighting, and unpacked her artwork.

== Opening ==
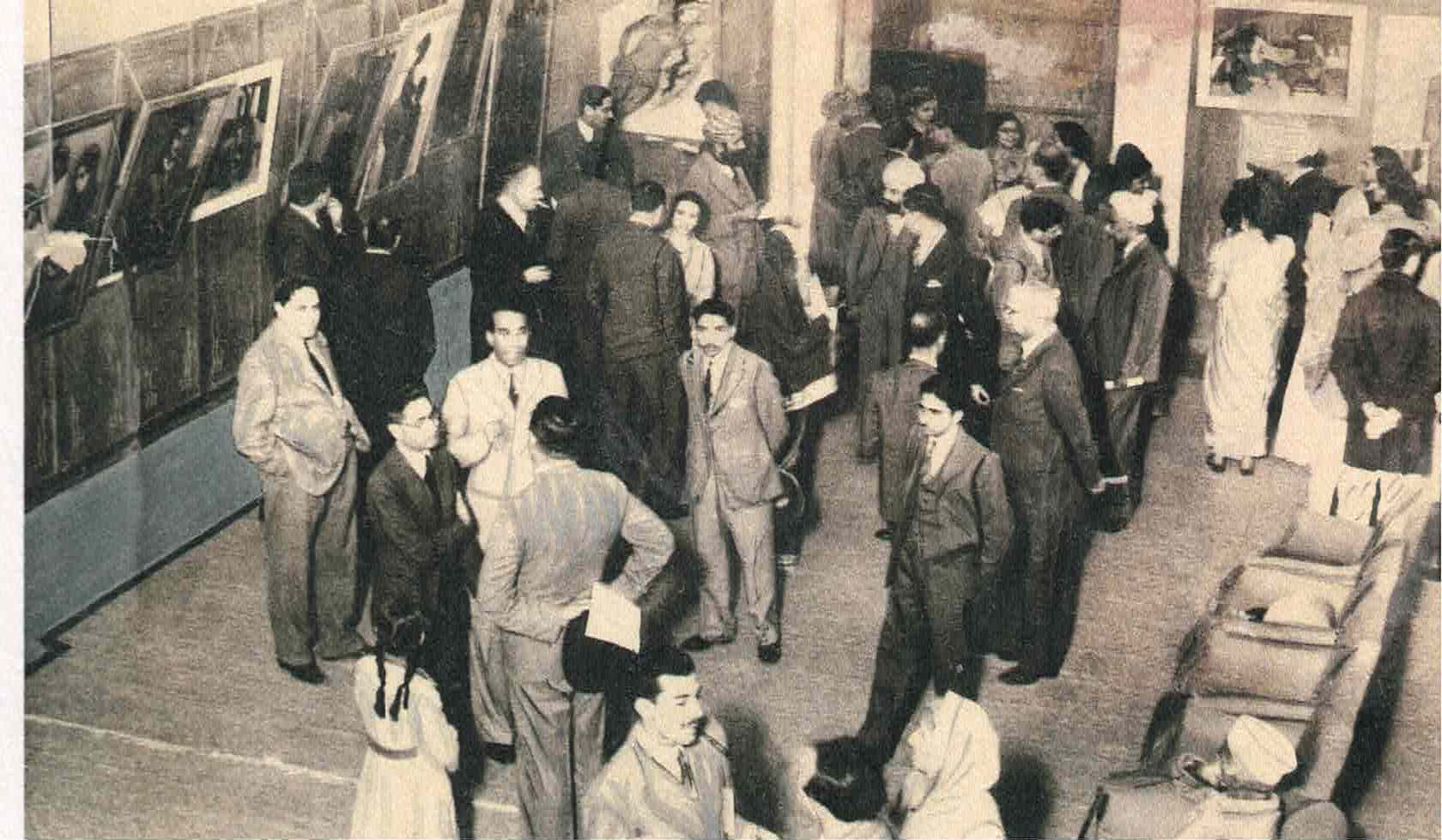
Exhibition opening at Lahore 1937

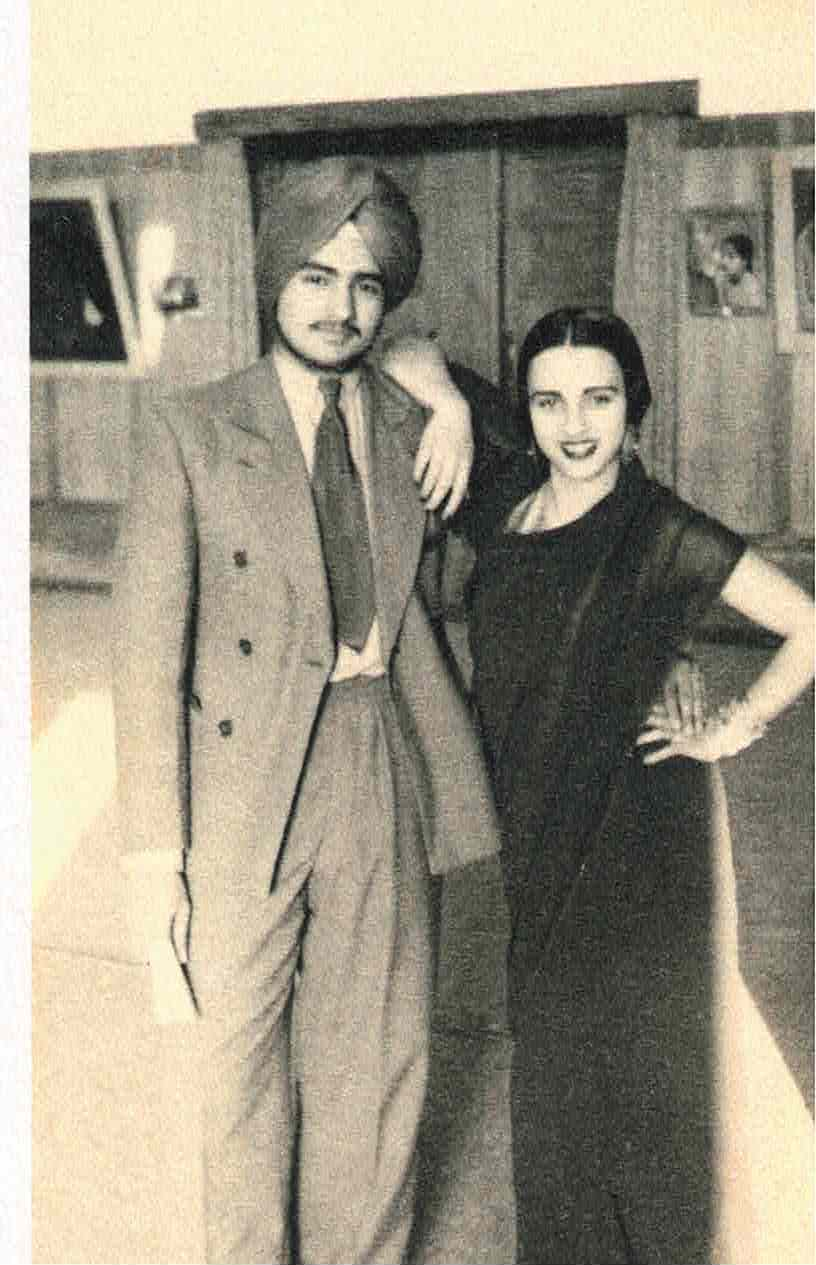
Amrita Sher-Gil and Dalip Singh Majithia 1937 Lahore

The exhibition was opened by Punjab's finance minister, Manohar Lal. Over 150 people attended on that day. Dressed in a gold-bordered sari, twice wrapped covering a brocade blouse, and wearing large Tibetan jewellery, Sher-Gil greeted guests at the entrance. Attendees included Dalip Singh Majithia, Badruddin Tyabji, Diwan Chaman Lall, Justice Bakshi Tek Chand, Lahore Museum's curator K. N. Sitaram, Kanwar Dalip Singh of Kapurthala, and Bhim Sen Sachar. Students of Punjab University attended. The Civil and Military Gazette's art critic Fabri was also present. It was there that Sher-Gil and Fabri first met. The governor, Sir Herbert William Emerson, and Lady Emerson, visited the exhibition for a private viewing on 24 November.

== Exhibits ==
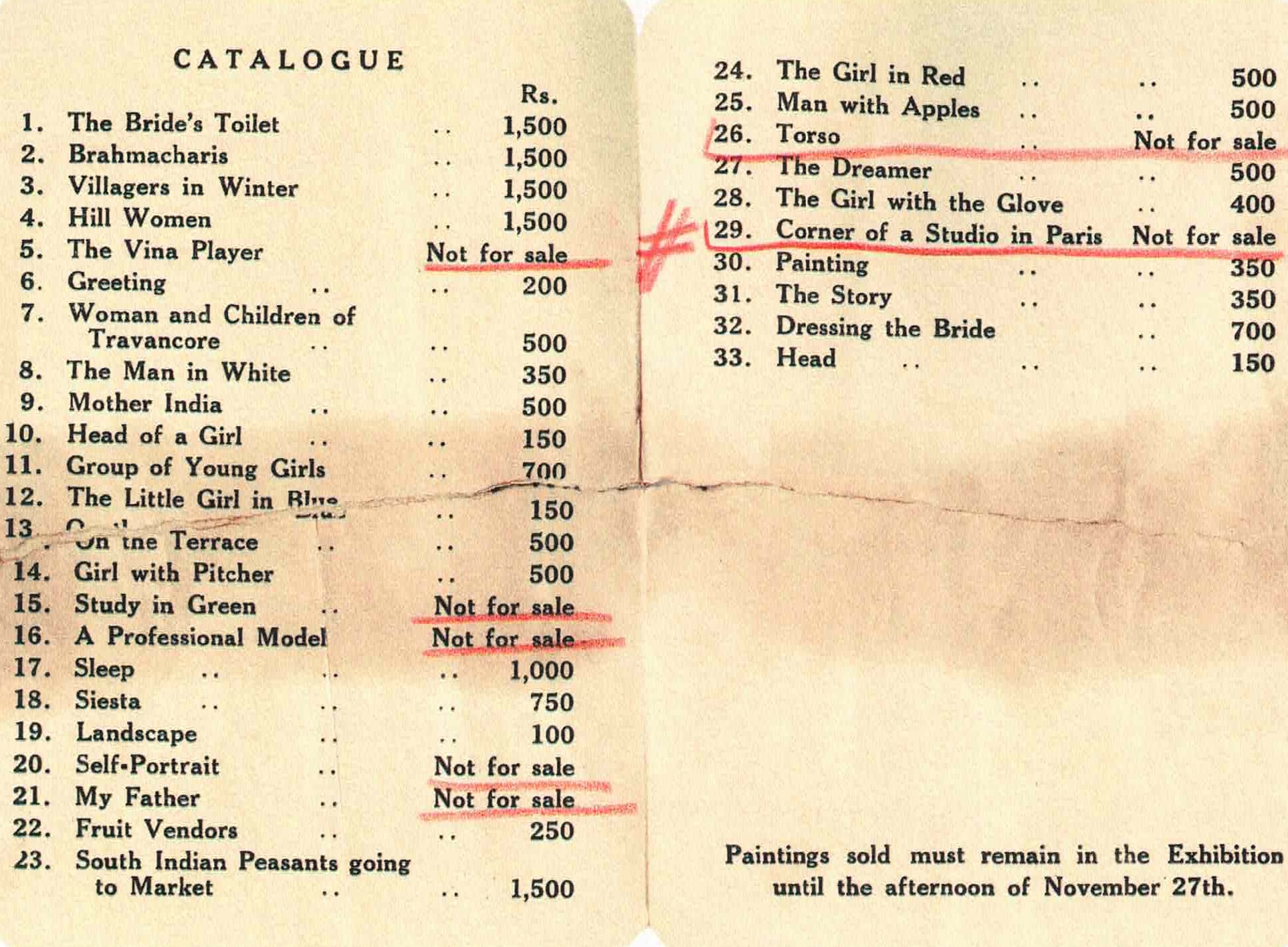
1937 Catalogue

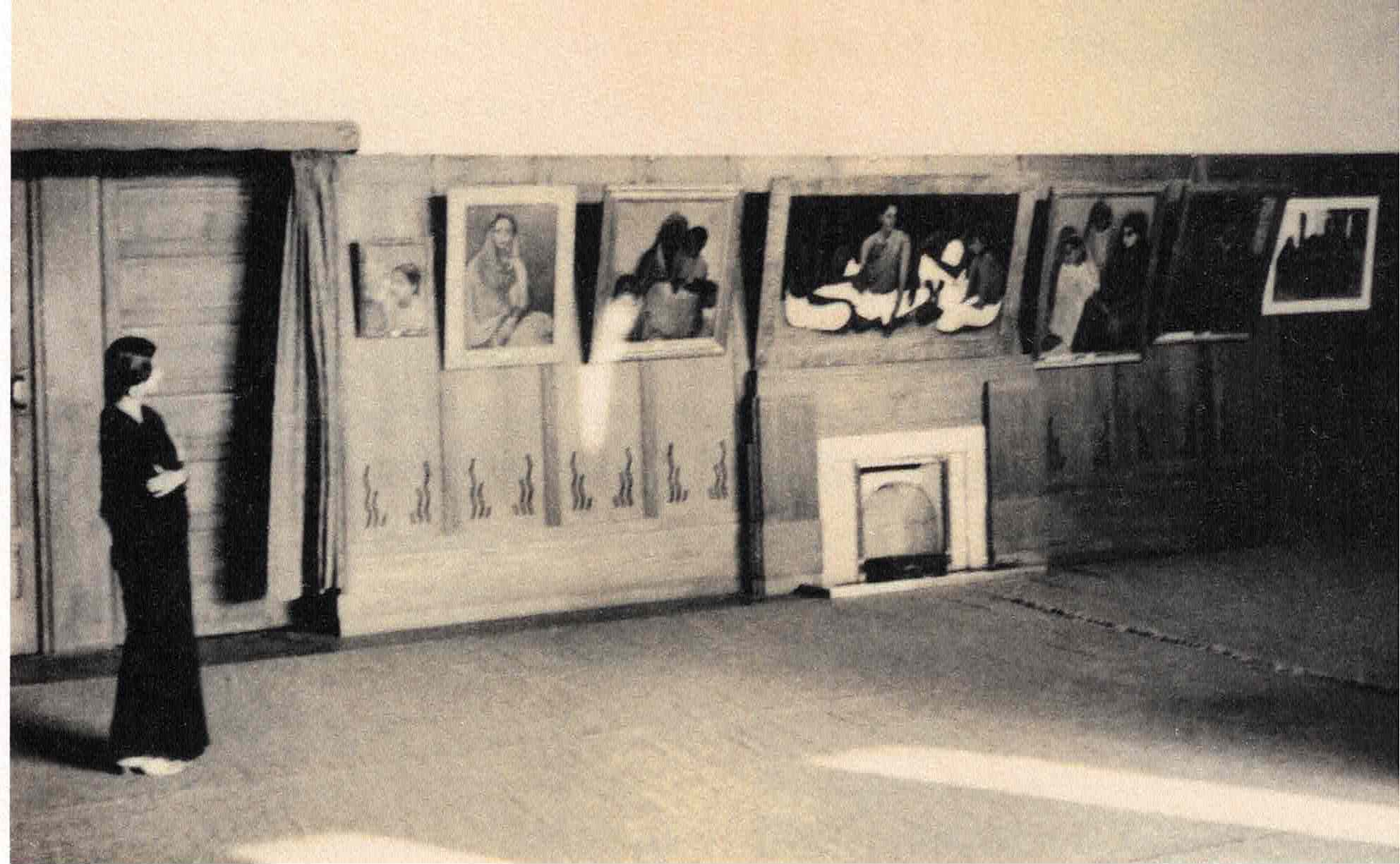
Amrita Sher-Gil at her 1937 Lahore Exhibition

Paintings exhibited included Young Man with Apples (1932), Sleep (1933), A Professional Model (1933), The Little Girl in Blue (1934), Three Girls (1935), The Bride's Toilet (1937), and The Story Teller (1937). The previous year, Sleep and Group of Young Girls had been displayed at the exhibition hall in the Public Gardens, Hyderabad. Hoping that the wealthy art collector, Nawab Salar Jung would purchase them, Sher-Gil was disappointed when after keeping them for several days the Nawab returned them, commenting that he had "no use for these Cubist pictures". Re-exhibited at the November 1937 Lahore show, they did not sell and remained in Sher-Gil's possession.

The self-portrait was bought by a person who subsequently commissioned Sher-Gil to do two portraits of Mrs Hiralal. Also, at Lahore, Sher-Gil painted two commissioned paintings, which she did not approve of and left them unsigned. Other paintings she completed there included The Red Brick House and a portrait of Helen Chaman Lall.

== Response ==
Four paintings were sold in total. Tyabji later recalled that "the exhibition was well attended", and that Sher-Gil appreciated that he bought The Story Teller. (Note: Catalogued as The Story in the original programme.) With the help of Chamanlall, The Little Girl in Blue was sold to Fabri. The Vina Player, Sher-Gil's mother's favourite, was initially not for sale, but then acquired by the Lahore Museum, through the encouragement of Fabri and Sita Ram. The other painting sold was titled Pink Self-portrait. (Note: No such painting title in the programme, though several self-portraits are listed.)

At the opening, Manohar Lal praised the self-portrait she did not like. Fabri called the show a "revelation", and "a feast for the eyes". He called her work "essentially modern without being fantastic", while criticising it for being "decorative to the extreme". With eight annas per entry, the exhibition made around ₹25 a day from entrance fees alone. On 24 November 1937, reviews of the exhibition in the Civil and Military Gazette coincided with reviews of the block-buster film Jeevan Prabhat. One newspaper reported of the artwork that "each one seemed to excel the other in art and presentation".

== List of paintings exhibited ==
This is a list of the 33 paintings exhibited at Lahore in 1937 as catalogued and titled in the original programme:

Catalogue number	Title	Image	Catalogue price (1937)	Notes
1	1937: The Bride's Toilet		₹1,500	One of Sher-Gil's South Indian trilogy.
2	1937: Brahmacharis		₹1,500	One of Sher-Gil's South Indian trilogy.
3	1935: Villagers in Winter		₹1,500	Later known as Hill Men.
4	1935: Hill Women		₹1,500	Depicts a girl and three young women.
5	1937: The Vina Player		Not for sale	Sold to the Museum of Lahore.
6	Greeting		₹200	
7	Woman and Children of Travancore		₹500	Vivan Sundaram notes that this painting was later renamed Fruit Vendors, though the exhibition catalogue lists both these as separate paintings (see 22).
8	1935: The Man in White		₹350	Offered ₹250
9	1935: Mother India		₹500	
10	1937: Head of a Girl		₹150	
11	1935: Group of Young Girls		₹700	Won the gold medal at the annual exhibition of the Bombay Art Society in 1937.
12	1934: The Little Girl in Blue		₹150	Bought at the 1937 exhibition by Charles Fabri with the assistance of Diwan Chaman Lall. Fetched ₹18.69 crore, or $2.67 million in 2018, through auction at Sotheby's, Mumbai.
13	1935: On the Terrace		₹500	
14	1937: Girl with Pitcher		₹500	
15	Study in Green		Not for sale	
16	1933: A Professional Model		Not for sale	
17	1933: Sleep		₹1,000	Earlier in 1937, Nawab Salar Jung had initially shown interest in it, though did not buy it. Later, Sher-Gil left it with Chaman Lall to "palm off", but it did not sell.
18	1937: Siesta		₹750	
19	Landscape		₹100	
20	Self-Portrait		Not for sale	Sold for ₹700.
21	1935: My Father		Not for sale	
22	Fruit Vendors		₹250	Vivan Sundaram notes that this painting was renamed from Woman and Children of Travancore (see 7), though the exhibition catalogue lists both these as separate paintings.
23	1935: South Indian Peasants going to Market		₹1,500	One of Sher-Gil's South Indian trilogy, later known as South Indian Villagers Going to Market.
24	The Girl in Red		₹500	
25	1932: Young Man with Apples		₹500	
26	Torso		Not for sale	
27	The Dreamer		₹500	
28	The Girl with the Glove		₹400	
29	Corner of a Studio in Paris		Not for sale	
30	Painting		₹350	Shortly after the exhibition, Sher-Gil wrote to Karl Khandalavala that she was sending him (among five paintings), "my fantasy", "which I have called Painting".
31	1937: The Story		₹350	Bought at the exhibition by Badruddin Tyabji. In 2023 it was sold for Rs 61.8 crore, equivalent to $7.45m.
32	1937: Dressing the Bride		₹700	
33	Head		₹150	

== See also ==
- List of paintings by Amrita Sher-Gil

== Bibliography ==
- Ananth, Deepak (2007). Amrita Sher-Gil: An Indian Artist Family of the Twentieth Century. Schirmer/Mosel. ISBN 978-3-8295-0270-2.
- Dalmia, Yashodhara (2013). Amrita Sher-Gil: A Life. Gurugram: Penguin Books. ISBN 978-0-14-342026-2.
- Sundaram, Vivan (2010). Amrita Sher-Gil: A Self-Portrait in Letters and Writings. Vol. 1. New Delhi: Tulika Books. pp. 1–417. ISBN 978-81-89487-59-1.
- Sundaram, Vivan (2010). Amrita Sher-Gil: A Self-Portrait in Letters and Writings. Vol. 2. New Delhi: Tulika Books. pp. 418–821. ISBN 978-81-89487-59-1.
