= Sleep (Sher-Gil) =

1933 painting by Amrita Sher-Gil

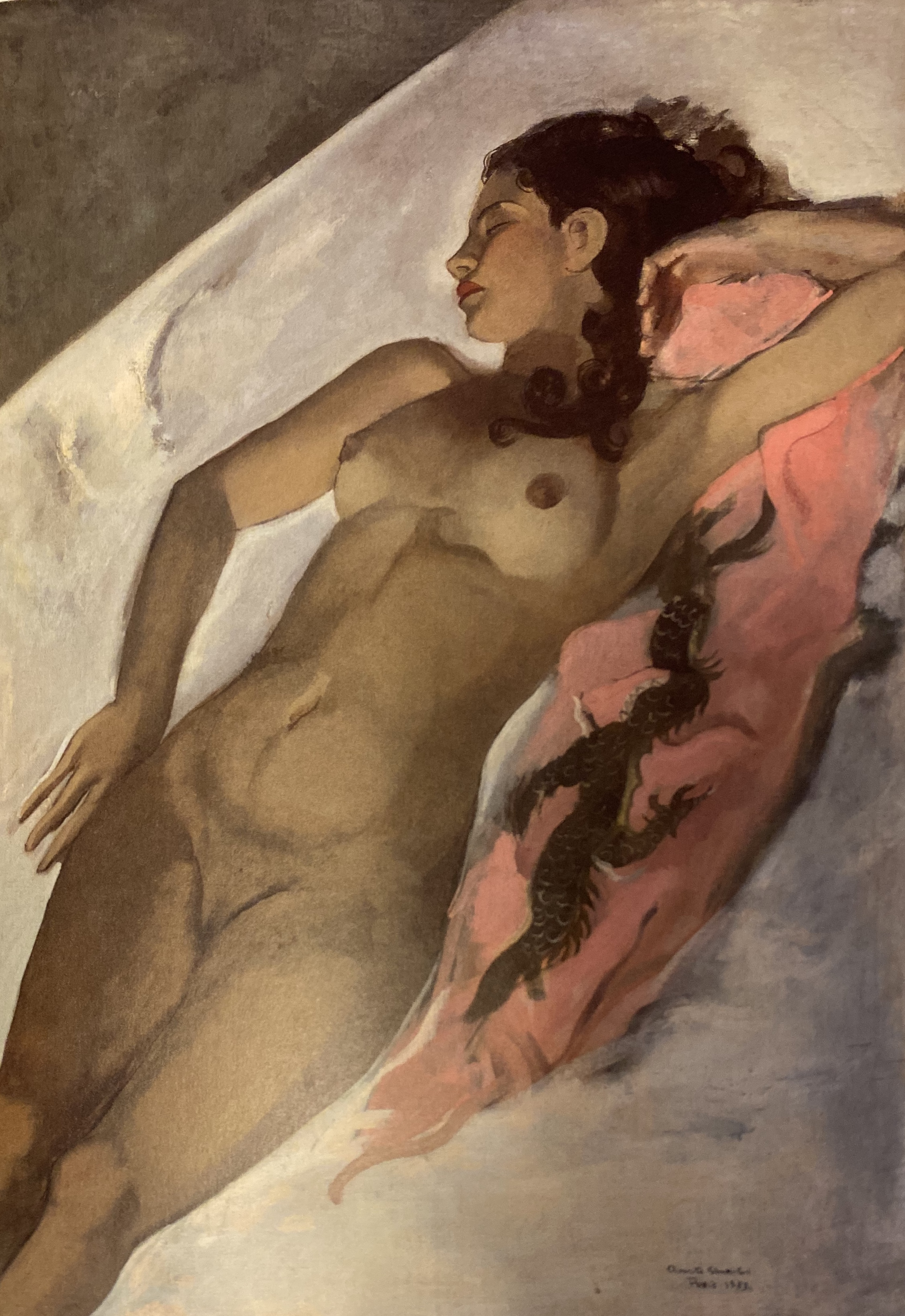
- Artist: Amrita Sher-Gil
- Year: 1933
- Dimensions: 112.5 cm × 79 cm (44.3 in × 31 in)
- Location: National Gallery of Modern Art, New Delhi

Sleep, also called Indu's Nude or Nude of Indira, is an oil on canvas painting by Amrita Sher-Gil, completed in 1933. It depicts a view from above of Sher-Gil's younger sister Indira, naked and lying on a white sheet at a diagonal, and with one raised arm. Just beneath her is a shawl depicting a dragon, whose body appears to flow in parallel with the flow of her hair and body curves.

Sher-Gil started the painting in 1932 in Paris while also painting a view from the top of Notre-Dame de Paris. Later, it was nearly sold to Nawab Salar Jung and was subsequently displayed at her solo exhibition at Faletti's Hotel in Lahore, British India, in 1937. In 1940, the painting was one of six of her works displayed at the Indian Academy of Fine Arts' Amritsar Exhibition. In 2007, it was shown at the Tate Gallery in London.

Although Sher-Gil and National Congressman Diwan Chaman Lall tried to sell the painting, it remained unsold, and is housed in the National Gallery of Modern Art, New Delhi.

== Origin and composition ==
Sleep is an oil on canvas painting by Amrita Sher-Gil, depicting her younger sister Indira. She started the painting in 1932 in Paris. In June 1932, she wrote to her mother that she was a workaholic painting a view from the top of Notre-Dame de Paris during the day and Sleep all night. She wrote:

These days I am painting a view from the top of the Notre Dame... From 6 O'clock in the evening until there is light I am painting a nude of Indu. You see, I work like a madman, no time even to think.

The painting is a view of Indira from above. She is lying naked and at a diagonal, on a white sheet, with her left arm raised. Just beneath her is a shawl depicting a dragon that appears to copy the flow of her hair and body curves.

== Exhibitions and sales ==
In December 1936, the painting was displayed at the exhibition hall in the Public Gardens, Hyderabad. There, the wealthy art collector, Nawab Salar Jung, requested that it be delivered to him, along with Three Girls (1935). Hoping that he would purchase it, Sher-Gil also sent him the Villagers and extended her visit. (Note: Dalmia names the nude sent as the Reclining Nude, but Sher-Gil's letter to Indira dated 5 January 1937 clarifies that it was the nude of Indu.) In January 1937, she wrote to Indira that "I may have sold your nude and the group of young girls to the Nawab Salar Jung, after the Nizam the richest man in Hyderabad, if I were a sycophant". However, after keeping them for several days, the Nawab returned the paintings, commenting that he had "no use for these Cubist pictures".

The painting was number 17 of 33 of Sher-Gil's works displayed at her solo exhibition at Faletti's Hotel in Lahore, British India, held from 21 to 27 November 1937. There, it was priced at ₹1,000 but did not sell. Writing from Budapest on 8 October 1938, Sher-Gil told her parents that she had left the painting she called "Indu's Nude" with the Indian National Congressman and her friend Diwan Chaman Lall "to see if he could palm it off on someone but he wasn't successful". In 1940, the painting was one of six of her works displayed at the Indian Academy of Fine Arts' Amritsar Exhibition, held from 31 October to 10 November, to raise money for the War Fund.

Housed at the National Gallery of Modern Art, New Delhi, Sleep was part of the 2007 exhibition held at the Tate Gallery in London.

== Response ==
According to scholar Nikky-Guninder Kaur Singh, the painting calls to mind Édouard Manet's Olympia. Former director of the Ernst Museum, Katalin Keserü, who curated several Sher-Gil exhibitions, notes that unlike most of her other nudes, Sleep and Reclining Nude (1933) appear as if possibly painted by a man. She describes Sleep as a "perfect composition".

== See also ==
- List of paintings by Amrita Sher-Gil

== Bibliography ==
- Dalmia, Yashodhara (2013). Amrita Sher-Gil: A Life. Gurugram: Penguin Books. ISBN 978-0-14-342026-2.
- Sundaram, Vivan (2010). Amrita Sher-Gil: A Self-Portrait in Letters and Writings. Vol. 1. New Delhi: Tulika Books. pp. 1–417. ISBN 978-81-89487-59-1.
- Sundaram, Vivan (2010). Amrita Sher-Gil: A Self-Portrait in Letters and Writings. Vol. 2. New Delhi: Tulika Books. pp. 418–821. ISBN 978-81-89487-59-1.
