= Hill Women =

1935 painting by Amrita Sher-Gil

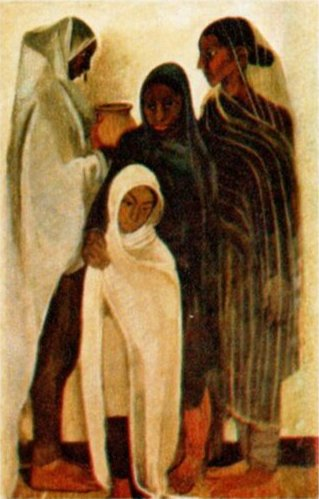
- Hill Women
- Artist: Amrita Sher-Gil
- Year: 1935
- Medium: Oil on canvas
- Dimensions: 147.3 cm × 87 cm (58.0 in × 34 in)
- Preceded by: Hill Men

Hill Women is an oil on canvas painting by Hungarian-Indian artist Amrita Sher-Gil, completed after she painted Hill Men in the winter of 1935 at Simla. Depicting a girl among three young women, it was influenced by the poor surrounding Sher-Gil's home in Simla, India.

The painting was exhibited at the Paris Salon in 1936, and later at Hyderabad that year. Sher-Gil picked it for display at her One Man Show in Lahore in 1937. In 1978, it appeared on an Indian postage stamp.

== Composition ==
Hill Women is an oil on canvas painting measuring 89 cm by 147.3 cm, depicting a girl among three young women. The work accompanied Sher-Gil's painting titled Hill Men, originally called Villagers in Winter. Both were completed in the winter of 1935, and influenced by the poor surrounding Sher-Gil's home in Simla.

According to Sher-Gil, generally she was not attempting to narrate any story in such paintings, but wished them to be "purely pictorial", claiming that she did not like "cheap emotional appeal". The sad open-eyed faced figures appear in black-green, each looking inwards. Their bodies are elongated and appear thin. The lips in one figure are seen to be pouting. Near the centre is a dark-faced child wrapped in a light shawl, and placed on a dark background. Three dark faces appear on a light background. The woman in the centre has one hand placed on the child's shoulder. Another is holding a terracotta pot. Draperies in the picture flow in curves at the top of the painting and in vertical drops to the ground.

== Exhibits ==
Hill Women was exhibited, along with Hill Men, at the Paris Salon in 1936 when it received a mention in French newspapers. Later that year, it was shown at Hyderabad with a sale price of ₹2,500. There, it was admired by Sarojini Naidu, who tried to persuade the Museum of Hyderabad to acquire the painting. According to Sher-Gil's note to her mother, Akbar Hydari of the museum "got frightened by the prices" of her work and changed his mind about purchasing any of them. In 1937, it was number four of her paintings displayed at her One Man Show in Lahore, at a reduced price at ₹1,500, but did not sell.

== Interpretation and response ==
Hill Women is generally considered one of Sher-Gil's well-liked paintings. The historians Yashodhara Dalmia and Giles Tillotson call it one of her most important pieces and a masterpiece. Dalmia points out that the subjects of the painting may appear poor, thin and sad, but they have "grace and dignity". She puts the pouting lips down to reflecting Sher-Gil's own sensuous reflection of herself. What strikes Tillotson is "their doleful expressions", appearing as "tombstones" and "detached from each other", yet "bound in a group". He calls the resting hand on the shoulder a "gesture of protection", while there is a "carefully contrived play of light and dark masses". The art critic and friend of Sher-Gil, Charles Fabri, describes the rounded figures as created by shadows, with Sher-Gil showing "complete lack of concern with the source or direction of light".

Katalin Keserü, who curated several Sher-Gil exhibitions, notes that along with Hill Men, Boy with Lemon, and Women, Hill Women is "static", and features lonely "figures looking far out of the picture". Her interpretation has been that these "were the representatives of India Amrita needed". The painter K. G. Subramanyan classes Hill Women with Hill Men and Three Girls, where the figures are grouped "in sharp silhouette against plain backgrounds".

== Legacy ==
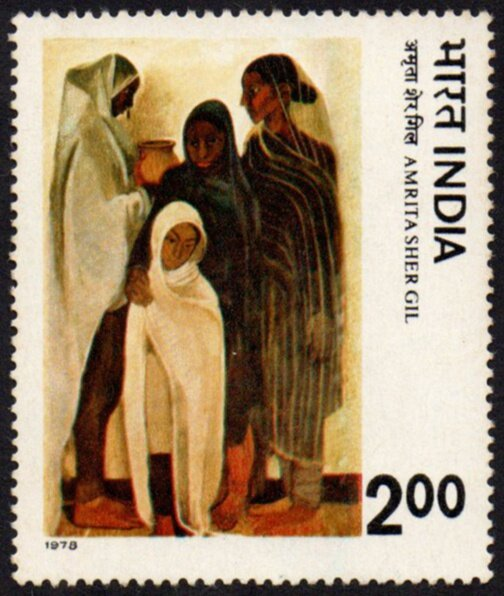
1978 postage stamp with Hill Women

In 1978, Hill Women appeared on an Indian postage stamp. The painting belongs to the private collection of Vivan Sundaram and Navina Sundaram, Delhi.

== See also ==
- List of paintings by Amrita Sher-Gil

== Bibliography ==
- Ananth, Deepak (2007). Amrita Sher-Gil: An Indian Artist Family of the Twentieth Century. Schirmer/Mosel. ISBN 978-3-8295-0270-2.
- Dalmia, Yashodhara (2013). Amrita Sher-Gil: A Life. Gurugram: Penguin Books. ISBN 978-0-14-342026-2.
- Sundaram, Vivan (2010). Amrita Sher-Gil: A Self-Portrait in Letters and Writings. Vol. 1. New Delhi: Tulika Books. pp. 1–417. ISBN 978-81-89487-59-1.
- Sundaram, Vivan (2010). Amrita Sher-Gil: A Self-Portrait in Letters and Writings. Vol. 2. New Delhi: Tulika Books. pp. 418–821. ISBN 978-81-89487-59-1.
