= The Vina Player =

1937 painting by Amrita Sher-Gil

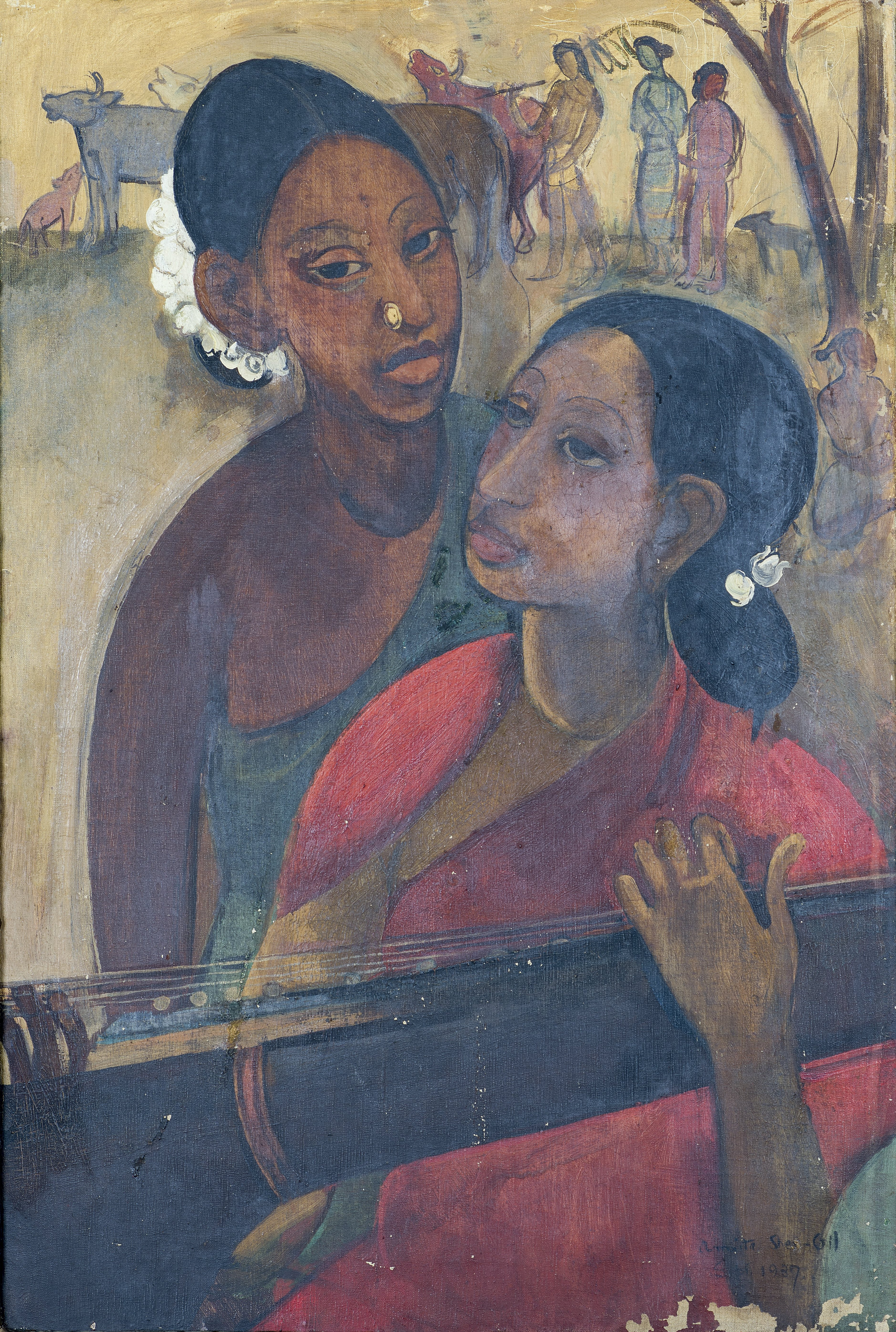
- A woman playing Veena to another woman
- Artist: Amrita Sher-Gil
- Year: 1937
- Medium: oil on canvas
- Subject: Veena, women
- Location: Lahore Museum, Lahore, Pakistan

The Vina Player (1937) is an oil on canvas painting by Hungarian-Indian artist Amrita Sher-Gil. It was number five of her 33 paintings displayed at her solo exhibition in the ballroom at Faletti's Hotel in Lahore, British India, held from 21 to 27 November 1937. Sher-Gil's mother's favourite, it was initially not for sale, but then acquired by the Lahore Museum, through the encouragement of art critic Charles Fabri and the then museum's curator K. N. Sitaram.

== See also ==
- List of paintings by Amrita Sher-Gil

== Bibliography ==
- Dalmia, Yashodhara (2013). Amrita Sher-Gil: A Life. Gurugram: Penguin Books. ISBN 978-0-14-342026-2.
- Sundaram, Vivan (2010). Amrita Sher-Gil: A Self-Portrait in Letters and Writings. Vol. 1. New Delhi: Tulika Books. pp. 1–417. ISBN 978-81-89487-59-1.
- Sundaram, Vivan (2010). Amrita Sher-Gil: A Self-Portrait in Letters and Writings. Vol. 2. New Delhi: Tulika Books. pp. 418–821. ISBN 978-81-89487-59-1.
