= Mother India (disambiguation) =

Mother India is an acclaimed 1957 Indian Hindi film epic.

Mother India may also refer to:

- Bharat Mata, the national personification of India
- Mother India (book), a controversial 1927 book about India by Katherine Mayo
- Mother India (painting), oil on canvas painting by Amrita Sher-Gil (1935)
- Mother India (magazine), an Indian spiritual magazine published since 1949
- Mother India (1938 film), a Bollywood film of the 1930s
- Mother India (1992 film), a 1992 Indian Telugu-language film starring Sharada

== See also ==
- Bharat Mata (painting), 1905 painting by Abanindranath Tagore about the personification
- Bharat Mata Mandir, a Hindu temple in Uttar Pradesh, India dedicated to the personification
