= South Indian Villagers going to Market =

1937 painting by Amrita Sher-Gil

- Artist: Amrita Sher-Gil
- Year: 1937
- Medium: Oil on canvas
- Dimensions: 90 cm × 147.3 cm (35 in × 58.0 in)
- Location: National Gallery of Modern Art, New Delhi

South Indian Villagers going to Market is an oil on canvas painting by Hungarian-Indian artist Amrita Sher-Gil. It was painted at Sher-Gil's home, The Holme, Shimla, India, around October- November 1937, along with the two smaller compositions, The Story Teller and Siesta. It is one of her large compositions and one of her South Indian trilogy, along with Bride's Toilet and Brahmacharis. In 1937 it was displayed at her Lahore exhibition for a price of ₹1,500.

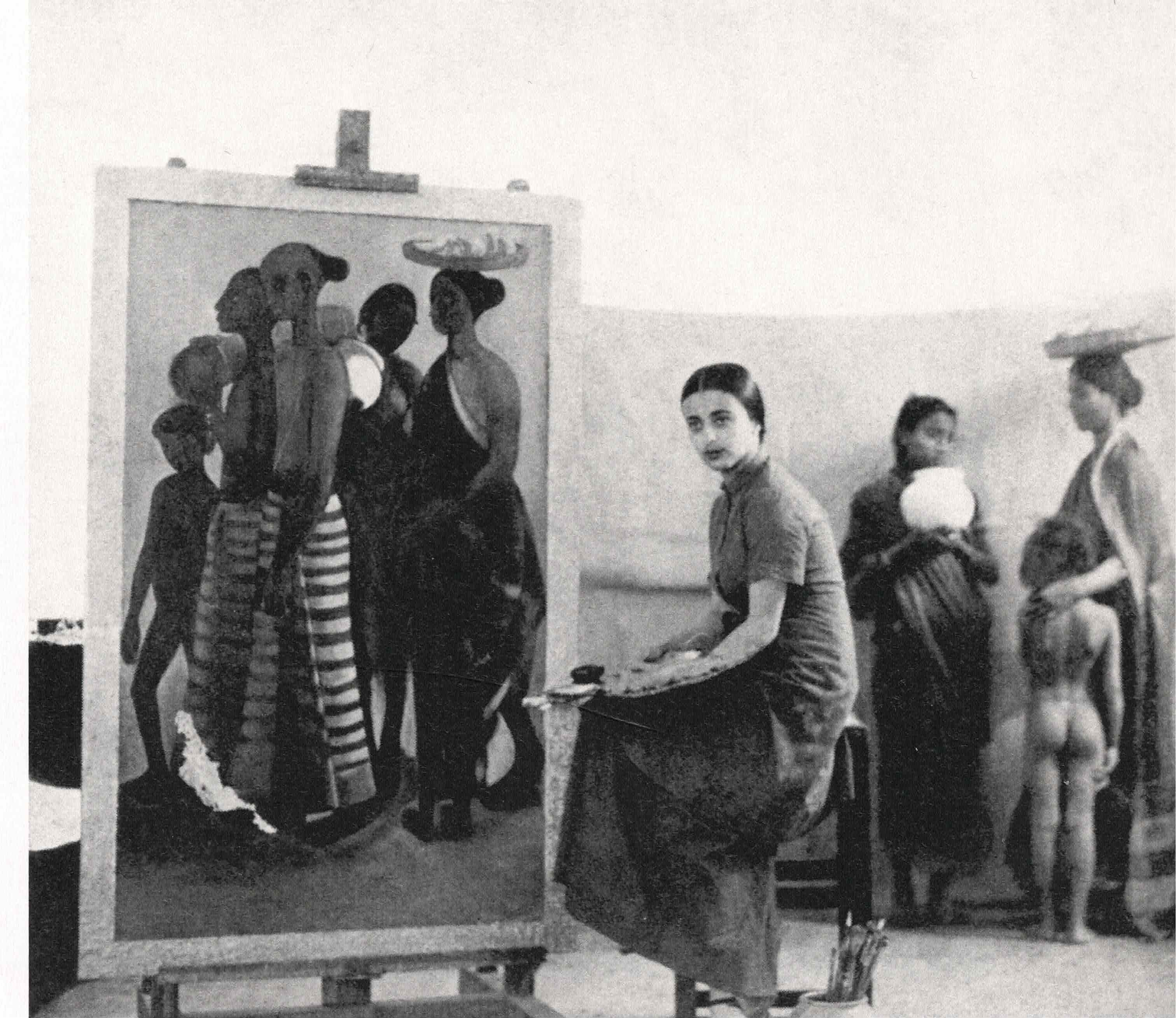
Amrita Sher-Gil painting South Indian Villagers Going to Market, 1937, with three of its models at her home in Simla.

== See also ==
- List of paintings by Amrita Sher-Gil

== Bibliography ==
- Dalmia, Yashodhara (2013). Amrita Sher-Gil: A Life. Gurugram: Penguin Books. ISBN 978-0-14-342026-2.
- Sundaram, Vivan (2010). Amrita Sher-Gil: A Self-Portrait in Letters and Writings. Vol. 1. New Delhi: Tulika Books. pp. 1–417. ISBN 978-81-89487-59-1.
- Sundaram, Vivan (2010). Amrita Sher-Gil: A Self-Portrait in Letters and Writings. Vol. 2. New Delhi: Tulika Books. pp. 418–821. ISBN 978-81-89487-59-1.
