= Reclining Nude (1933) =

1933 painting by Amrita Sher-Gil

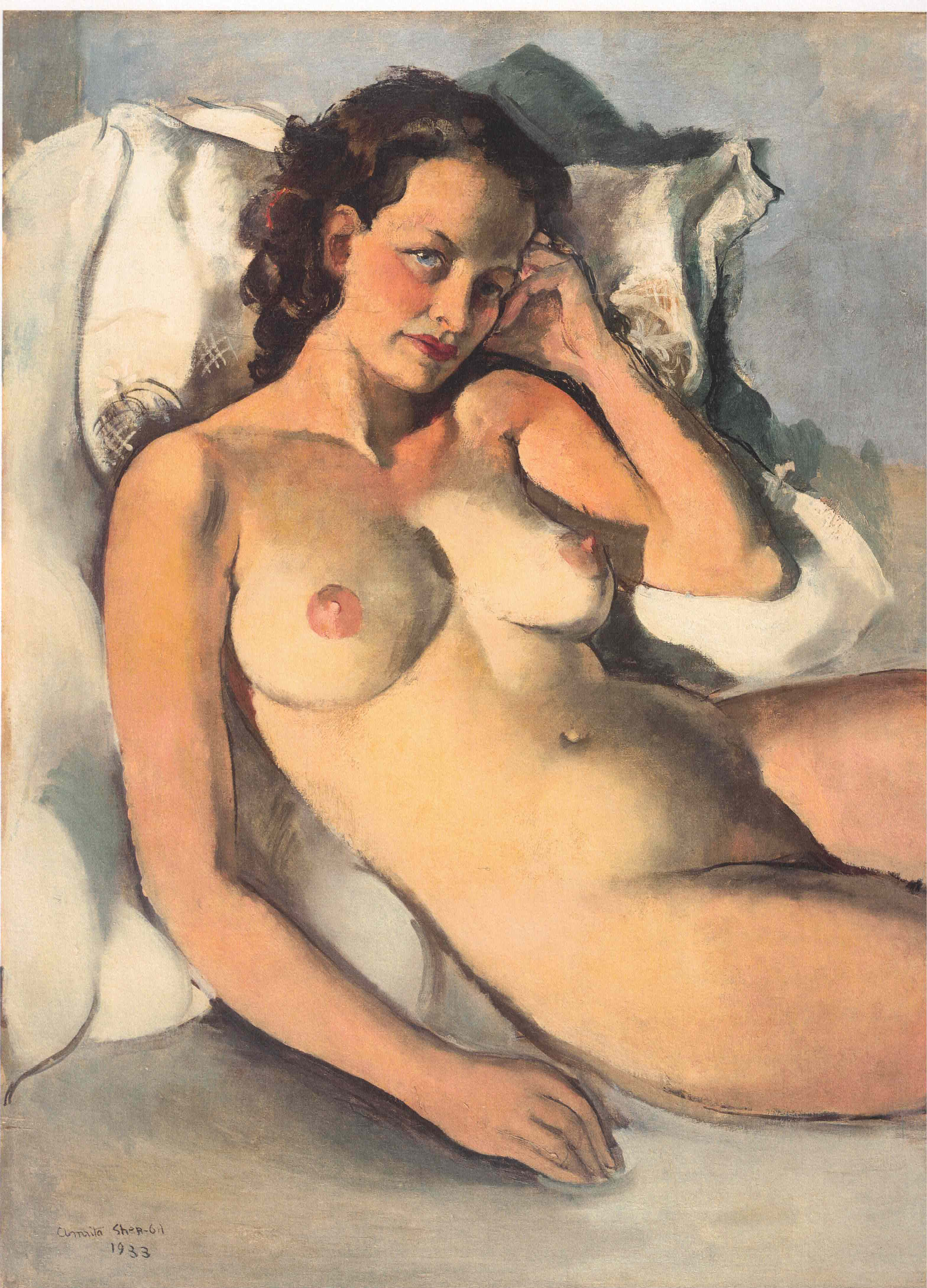
- Artist: Amrita Sher-Gil
- Year: 1933
- Location: National Gallery of Modern Art, New Delhi

Reclining Nude is an oil on canvas painting by Amrita Sher-Gil, completed in 1933 in Budapest. It depicts Sher-Gil's cousin Viola, sister of her husband Victor Egan. (Note: Dalmia names the nude sent to Nawab Salar Jung in 1936 as the Reclining Nude, but Sher-Gil's letter to Indira dated 5 January 1937 says that it was the Nude of Indu.)

== See also ==
- List of paintings by Amrita Sher-Gil

== Bibliography ==
- Dalmia, Yashodhara (2013). Amrita Sher-Gil: A Life. Gurugram: Penguin Books. ISBN 978-0-14-342026-2.
- Sundaram, Vivan (2010). Amrita Sher-Gil: A Self-Portrait in Letters and Writings. Vol. 1. New Delhi: Tulika Books. pp. 1–417. ISBN 978-81-89487-59-1.
- Sundaram, Vivan (2010). Amrita Sher-Gil: A Self-Portrait in Letters and Writings. Vol. 2. New Delhi: Tulika Books. pp. 418–821. ISBN 978-81-89487-59-1.
