= Fire on the Ganges =

Fire on the Ganges: Life among the Dead in Banaras
- Author: Radhika Iyengar
- Language: English
- Published: 2023
- Publisher: HarperCollins
- ISBN: 9356994676

Fire on the Ganges: Life among the Dead in Banaras is a book based on seven to eight years of research on the Dom community of Varanasi, by journalist Radhika Iyengar. It was published by HarperCollins in 2023.

== Reception ==
Sudhirendar Sharma of the Hindustan Times described the book as an "interesting reading" that brings attention to an essential social function, noting that Iyengar presents the lived reality of the Dom community with "empathy and concern" while highlighting the socio-cultural ironies and caste prejudices they face. Sathya Saran of The New Indian Express called the book a "valuable document and a scathing indictment" of ongoing caste and gender inequalities in India, commending Iyengar's empathy and extensive research. While noting that certain detailed passages on caste structures and customs gave parts of the book an "academic" tone aimed at Western readers, Saran highlighted how the narratives of individual community members demonstrate emerging potential for social change.
