= Mother India (painting) =

Painting by Amrita Sher-Gil

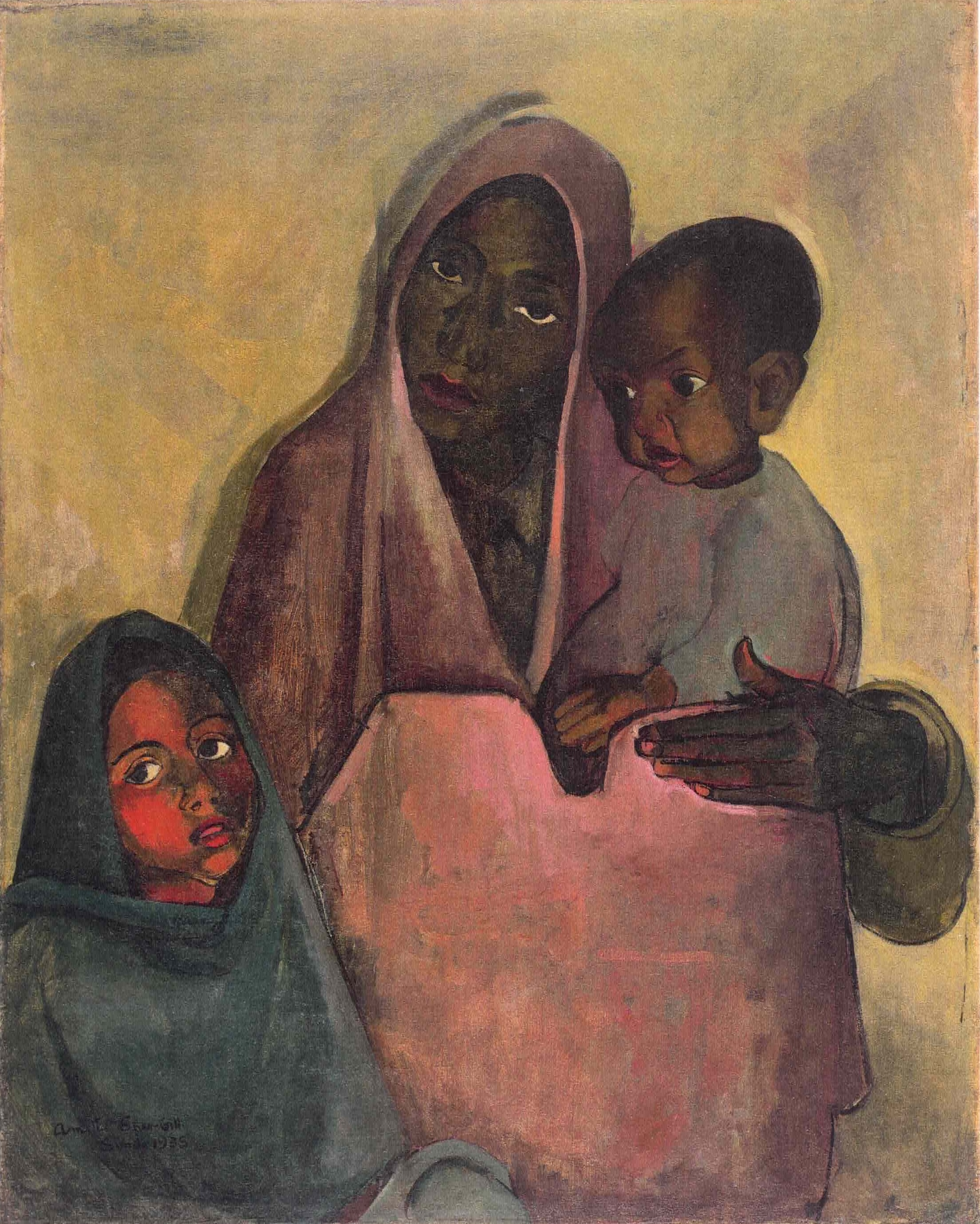
- Artist: Amrita Sher-Gil
- Year: 1935
- Medium: oil on canvas
- Dimensions: 78 cm × 62 cm (31 in × 24 in)
- Location: National Gallery of Modern Art, New Delhi

Mother India is an oil on canvas painting by Hungarian-born Indian artist Amrita Sher-Gil (1913 – 1941), completed in May/June 1935 in Simla. The painting depicts an Indian peasant mother with her son and daughter, and was one of 33 of Sher-Gil's works displayed at her successful solo exhibition at Faletti's Hotel in Lahore, British India, held in 1937. There it was priced at ₹500. Under India's Antiquities and Art Treasures Act (1972), the work is a national art treasure and must stay in the country.

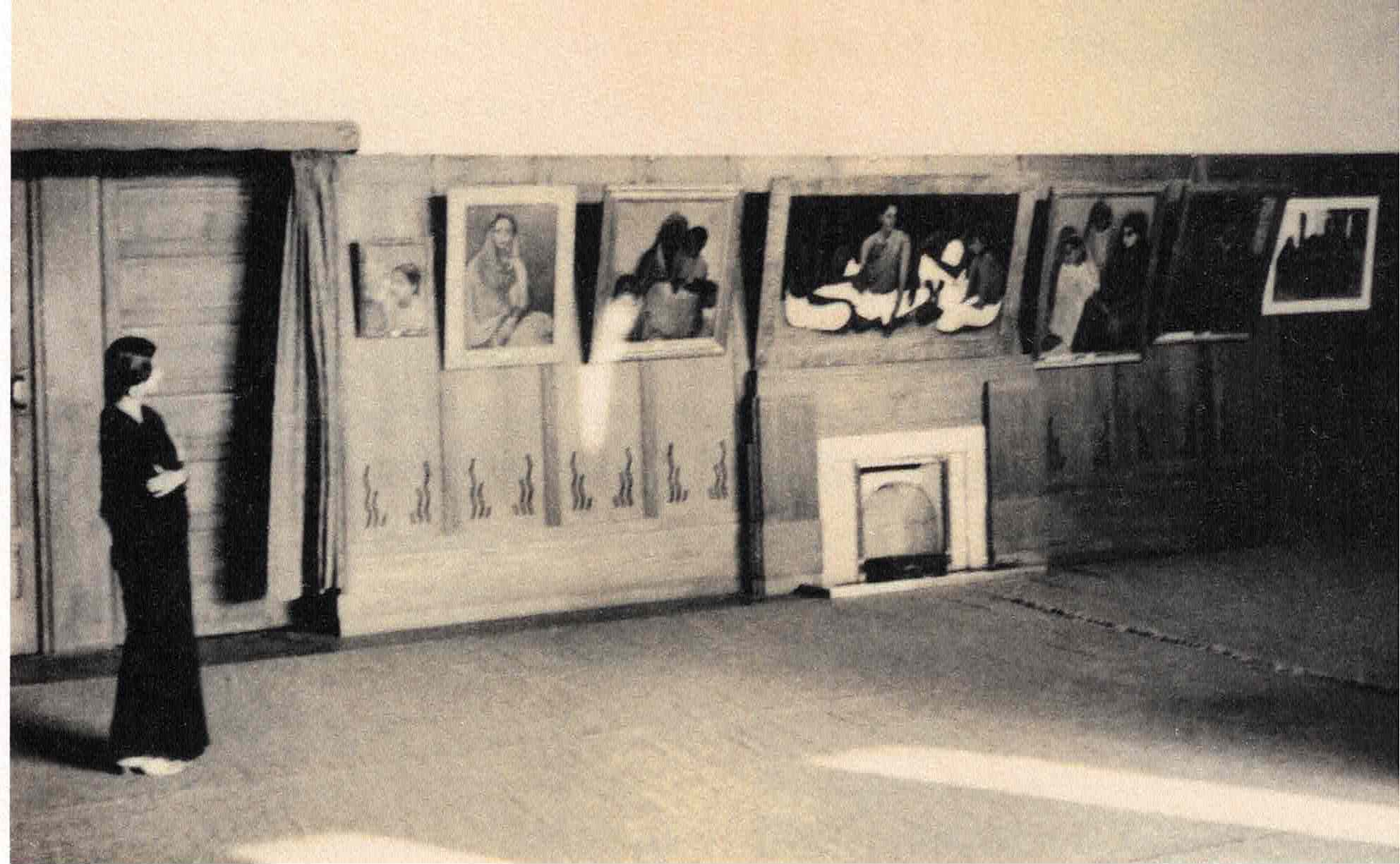
Amrita Sher-Gil at her 1937 Lahore Exhibition

== See also ==
- List of paintings by Amrita Sher-Gil

== Bibliography ==
- Dalmia, Yashodhara (2013). Amrita Sher-Gil: A Life. Gurugram: Penguin Books. ISBN 978-0-14-342026-2.
- Khullar, Sonal (2015). Worldly Affiliations: Artistic Practice, National Identity, and Modernism in India, 1930 1990. University of California Press. ISBN 978-0-520-28367-1.
- Sundaram, Vivan (2010). Amrita Sher-Gil: A Self-Portrait in Letters and Writings. Vol. 1. New Delhi: Tulika Books. pp. 1–417. ISBN 978-81-89487-59-1.
- Sundaram, Vivan (2010). Amrita Sher-Gil: A Self-Portrait in Letters and Writings. Vol. 2. New Delhi: Tulika Books. pp. 418–821. ISBN 978-81-89487-59-1.
