= Priyambada Mohanty Hejmadi =

Indian biologist and dancer

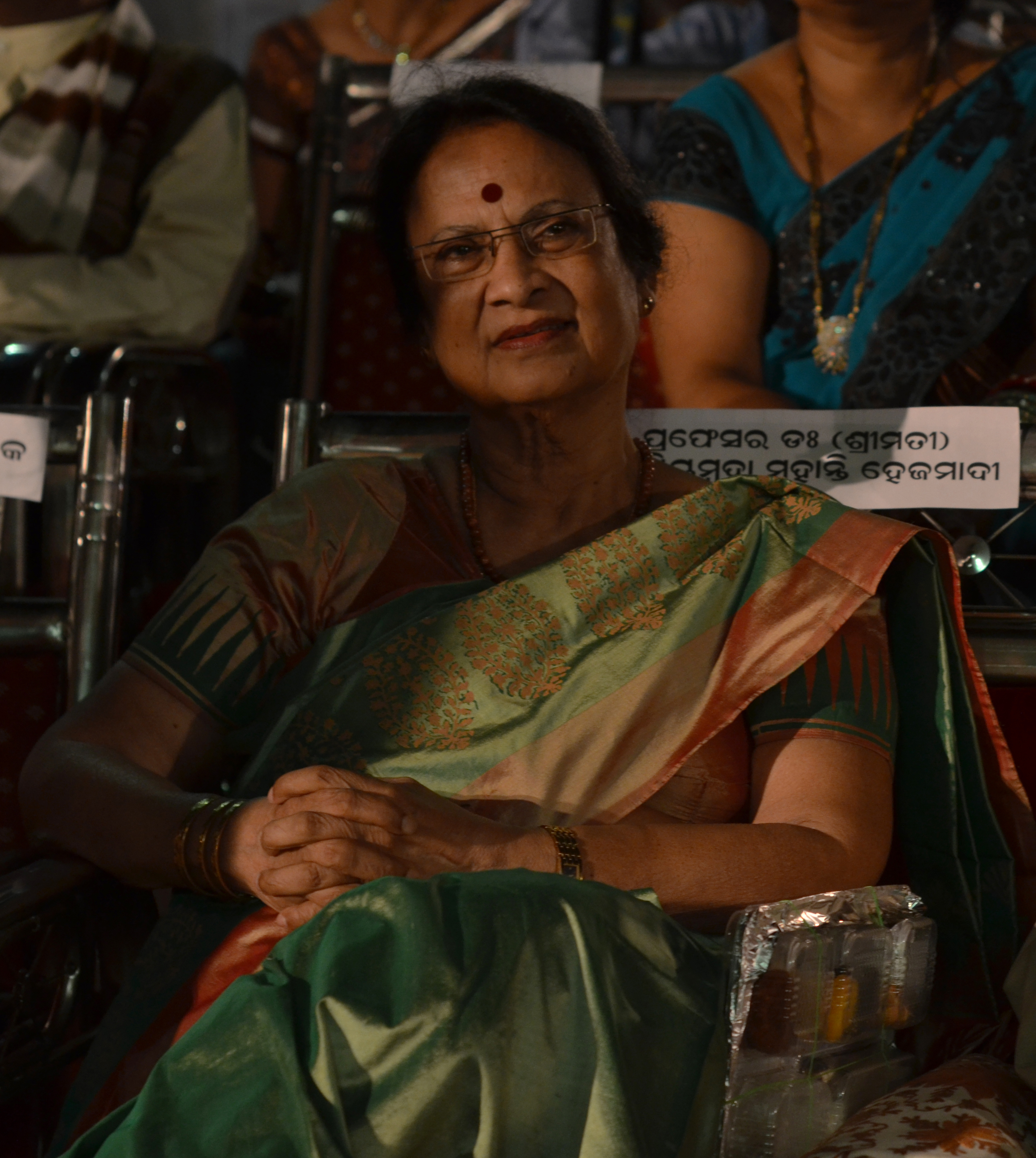
- Priyambada Mohanty Hejamdi during the 22nd Odia Film Award ceremony 2014, Bhubaneswar.
- Born: 18 November 1939 (age 86); India
- Occupations: Dancer • Ex-Vice Chancellor, Sambalpur University • Author • Professor of Zoology
- Known for: Developmental biology • Odissi pioneer
- Awards: Padma Shri (Science & Engineering) • Central Sangeet Natak Akademi award • Governor's Plaque (Odissi Dance)

Priyambada Mohanty Hejmadi is an Indian classical dancer, scientist, academician, art writer, and biologist.

== Early life ==
Born on 18 November 1939, she mastered the Indian classical dance form of Odissi from an early age under Ban Bihari Maiti. Her Odissi performance at the Inter-University Youth Festival in New Delhi in 1954 is reported to have helped the dance form to gain international attention through Charles Fabri, the renowned art critic from Hungary, who was present at the function.

Priyambada secured a master's degree and subsequently, obtained a doctoral degree in zoology from the University of Michigan, Ann Arbor.

Priyambada is a Fellow of the Indian Academy of Sciences. She has written numerous articles and books on both dance and zoology, including, Odissi: An Indian Classical Dance Form, elaborating the history and evolution of the Indian classic form of Odissi. "A study of ecology, breeding patterns, development and karyotype patterns" elaborating patterns of the olive ridley, Lepidochelys Olivacea of Gahirmatha of Orissa.

She is a recipient of the "Odissi Nrutya Sanman" which she received in 2013. The Government of India awarded her the fourth highest civilian award of the Padma Shri in 1998 for her contributions towards the fields of science and technology.

== See also ==
- Odissi
- Sambalpur University
