= Charles Fabri =

Hungarian art critic, writer, and Indologist

- Born: Károly Lajos Fábri; 18 November 1899; Budapest, Hungary
- Died: 7 July 1968 (aged 68)
- Occupation: Art critic

Charles Fabri (18 November 1899 – 7 July 1968) was a Hungarian art critic, writer, and Indologist. He was a former curator of the Kern Institute Library, Leiden University, curator of the Lahore Museum, Pakistan, and later lecturer at the National Museum of India, New Delhi, before lecturing at the Architecture and Art Departments of Delhi Polytechnic.

== Early life and education ==
Károly Lajos Fábri was born on 18 November 1899 in Budapest, Hungary, into a Jewish family. He had one older brother and his father owned a chain of hotels. During the First World War, he served in the army, and after, as he began university, his family lost its fortune.

In 1924 Fabri completed a masters in philosophy, psychology and Germanic philology from the University of Pécs, and three years later gained a doctorate in philosophy. At university he also undertook a personal study of Indology and Indian art. He gained his PhD in philosophy in 1927.

== Career ==
Between 1927 and 1934 Fabri was curator of the Kern Institute Library, Leiden University. From 1930 to 1934 Fabri worked with Aurel Stein on the Archaeological Survey of India in India, and accompanied Stein to India in 1932 to work on the Indus Valley excavations.

=== 1933–1936 ===
In 1933 Rabindranath Tagore invited Fabri to teach art history at Santiniketan.

=== Lahore (1937) ===
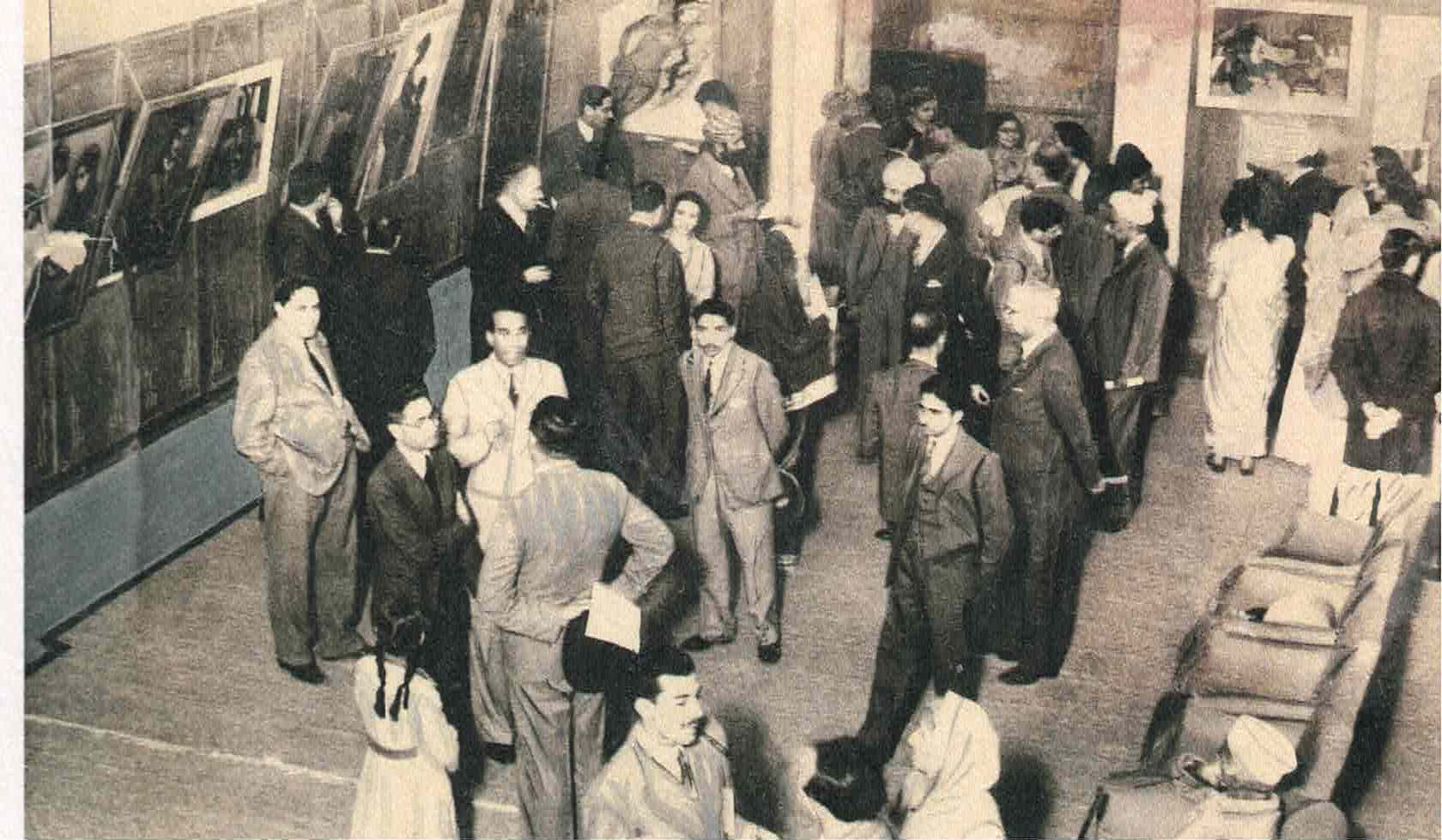
Exhibition opening at Lahore 1937

Fabri became a British citizen in 1937. That year he first met artist Amrita Sher-Gil in November, when as art critic for the Civil and Military Gazette, he reported on her solo exhibition held in the ballroom of Faletti's Hotel in Lahore, British India. There, with the assistance of Diwan Chaman Lall, Fabri acquired The Little Girl in Blue and it remained in his family until being sold in 2018. (Note: Fabri either bought it or Sher-Gil gifted to him.) He also assisted in the sale of The Vina Player to the Lahore Museum. He wrote that "Miss Sher-Gil's oeuvre is essentially modern without being fantastic. Simplification and the grasping of important essentials are the key-note in most of her work and there is a certain quality of decorativeness in most of her canvases. Her most fascinating subjects are women and children." In an essay he wrote after her death, he called her a "miraculous marriage of Indian and Western, brought up in the discipline of western painting, suffused in her mental make-up with Indian feeling and attitudes".

=== 1938 onwards ===
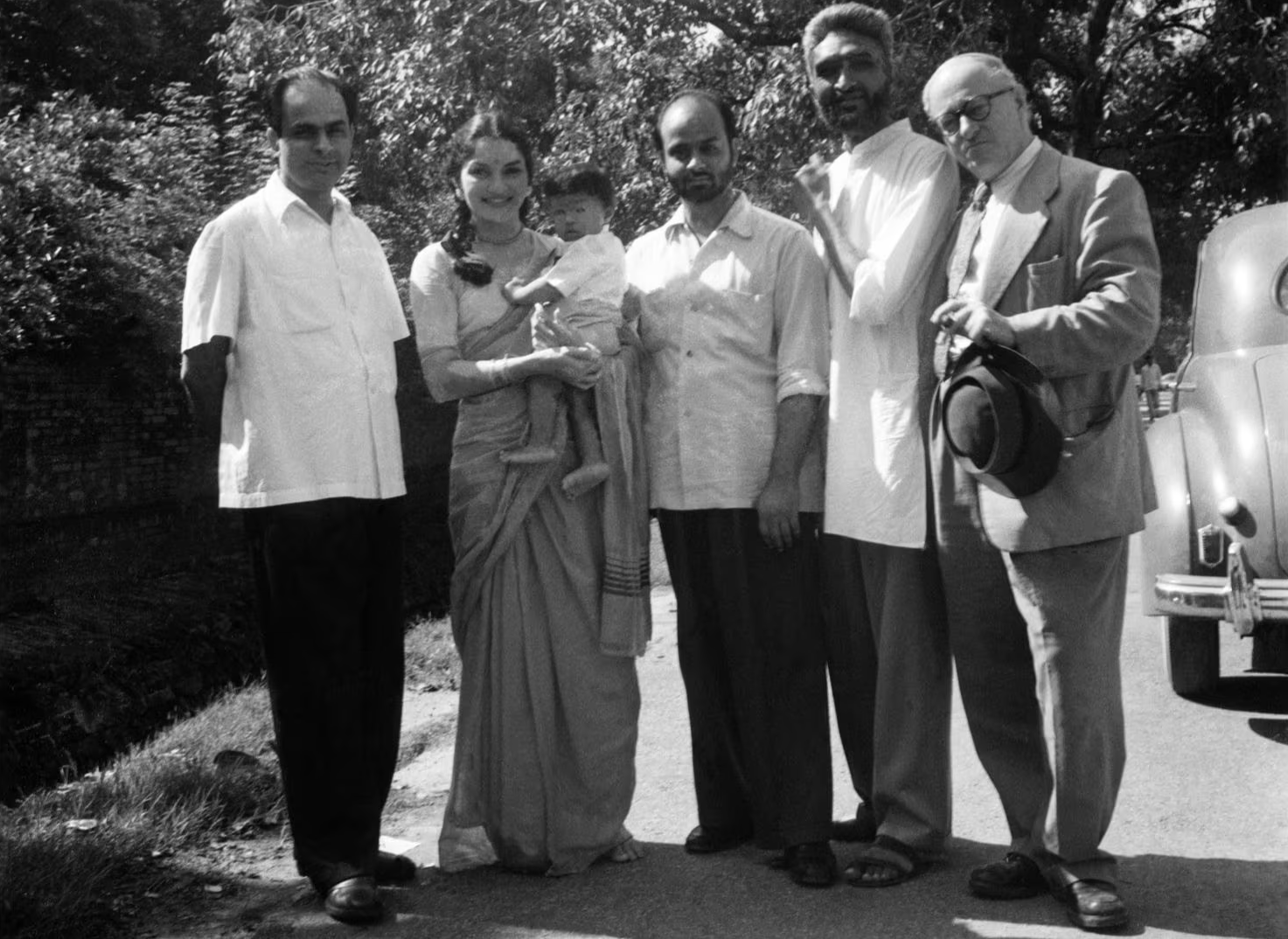
Inder Kumar Gujral, Indrani Rahman with Ram Rahman, Satish Gujral, MF Husain, Charles Fabri

Between 1938 and 1945 he was director of the Punjab Exploration Fund.

Between 1945 and 1947 Fabri was curator of the Lahore Museum. In 1947 he married Ratna Mathur. He took up Indian citizenship in 1947. From 1947 to 1950 he lectured at the National Museum of India, New Delhi.

For The Statesman he became critic for dance, drama and art.

In 1947 Fabri published Indian Flamingo: A Novel of Modern India. Set in the 1930s it features a Lahore Museum director falling in love with a 23 year old painter based on Sher-Gil. The dedication in the book reads " to the beloved, undying memory of AMRITA and her sisters and brothers of the new India".

From 1950 to 1959 Fabri lectured at the Architecture and Art Departments of Delhi Polytechnic. His masterpiece, Fundamental: History of Indian Art (1956–1958), created with the assistance of the Bollingen Foundation, remains unpublished.

== Death and legacy ==
Fabri died in July 1968, around two years after being diagnosed with throat cancer. He is remembered for his contributions to Indian art, and to recognising Odissi as a classical dance.

== Selected publications ==
=== Thesis ===
- William James: egy filozófus arcképe (William Jones: the portrait of a philosopher) (1928), Pécs (Specimina Dissertationum Facultatis Philosophiae Regiae Hungaricae Universitatis Elisabethianae Quinqueecclesiensis 6). – PhD thesis Pécs.

=== Articles ===
- Fábri, C. L. (July 1931). "Two Notes on Indian Head-dress". Journal of the Royal Asiatic Society. 63 (3): 597–601. doi:10.1017/S0035869X00110627. ISSN 1474-0591.
- Fábri, C. L. (April 1935). "The Punch-marked Coins: A Survival of the Indus Civilization". Journal of the Royal Asiatic Society. 67 (2): 307–318. doi:10.1017/S0035869X00086482. ISSN 2051-2066.
- Fabri, Charles L. (1954). "Review of Drāviḍa and Kerala in the Art of Travancore". Artibus Asiae. 17 (3/4): 328–330. doi:10.2307/3249065. ISSN 0004-3648.

=== Books ===
- Fabri, C. L. (1936). Annual Report Of The Archaeological Survey Of India For The Years 1930-31, 1931-32, 1933-34 And 1933–34. Delhi: Manager of Publications.
- Fabri, Charles Louis (1960). A History of Indian Dress. Calcutta: Orient Longmans.
- Fabri, Charles Louis (1963). An introduction to Indian architecture. New York: Asia Publishing House.
- Discovering Indian sculpture : a brief history (1970)
- Fabri, Charles Louis (1974). History of the art of Orissa. Bombay: Orient Longman.
- Bethlenfalvy, Géza, Charles Louis Fabri: his life and works, comp. and ed., New Delhi 1980

== See also ==
- Indrani Rahman
- Priyambada Mohanty Hejmadi

== Bibliography ==
- Dalmia, Yashodhara (2013). Amrita Sher-Gil: A Life. Gurugram: Penguin Books. ISBN 978-0-14-342026-2.
- Sundaram, Vivan (2010). Amrita Sher-Gil: A Self-Portrait in Letters and Writings. Vol. 1. New Delhi: Tulika Books. pp. 1–417. ISBN 978-81-89487-59-1.
- Sundaram, Vivan (2010). Amrita Sher-Gil: A Self-Portrait in Letters and Writings. Vol. 2. New Delhi: Tulika Books. pp. 418–821. ISBN 978-81-89487-59-1.
