= Brahmacharis (painting) =

1937 painting by Amrita Sher-Gil

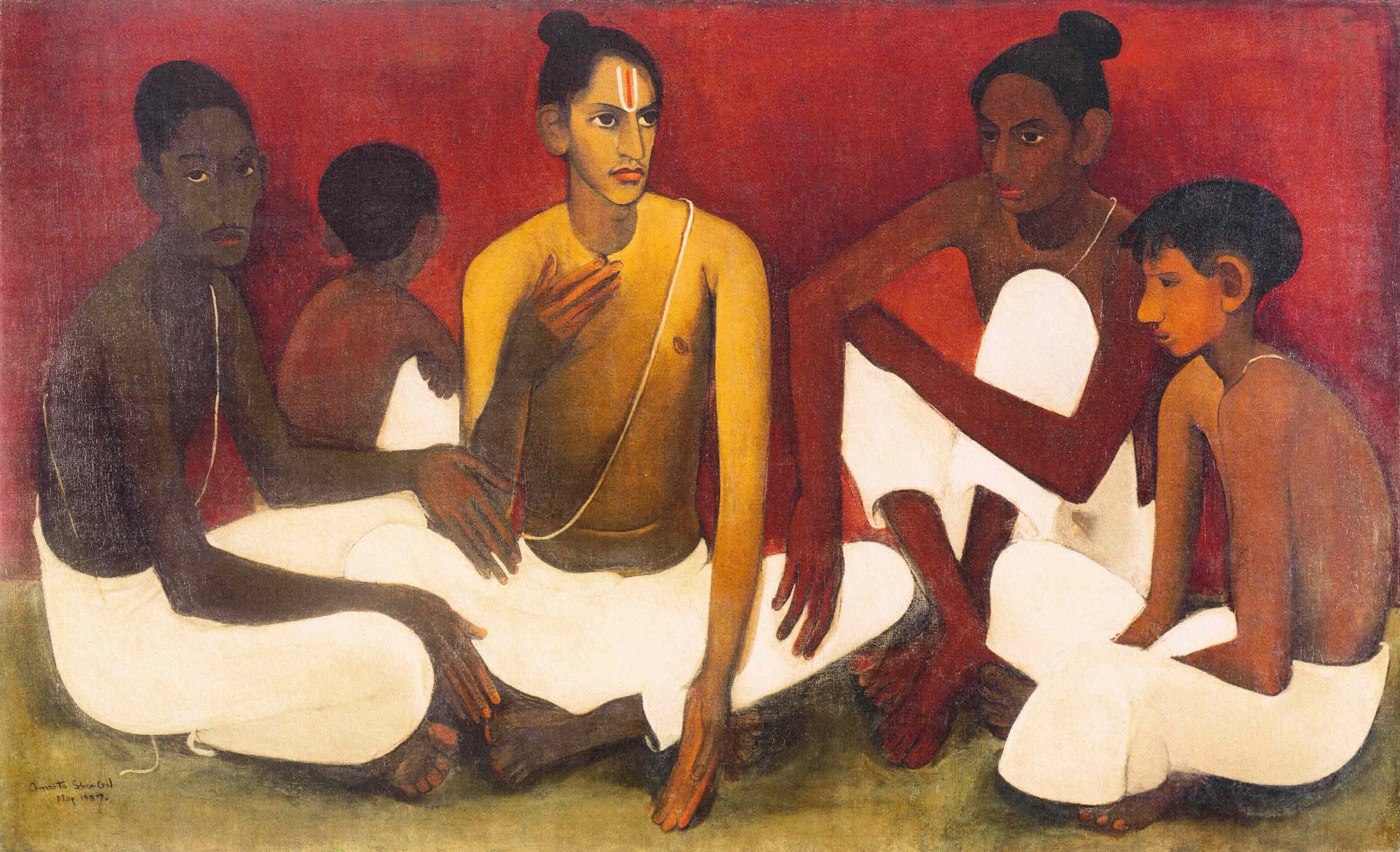
- Artist: Amrita Sher-Gil
- Year: 1937
- Medium: Oil on canvas
- Dimensions: 144.5 cm × 86.5 cm (56.9 in × 34.1 in)
- Location: National Gallery of Modern Art, New Delhi

Brahmacharis is an oil on canvas painting by Hungarian-Indian artist Amrita Sher-Gil, completed in May 1937 at Shimla, India. It is one of her large compositions and one of her South Indian trilogy, along with Bride's Toilet and South Indian Villagers going to Market. In 1937 it was displayed at her Lahore exhibition for a price of ₹1,500.

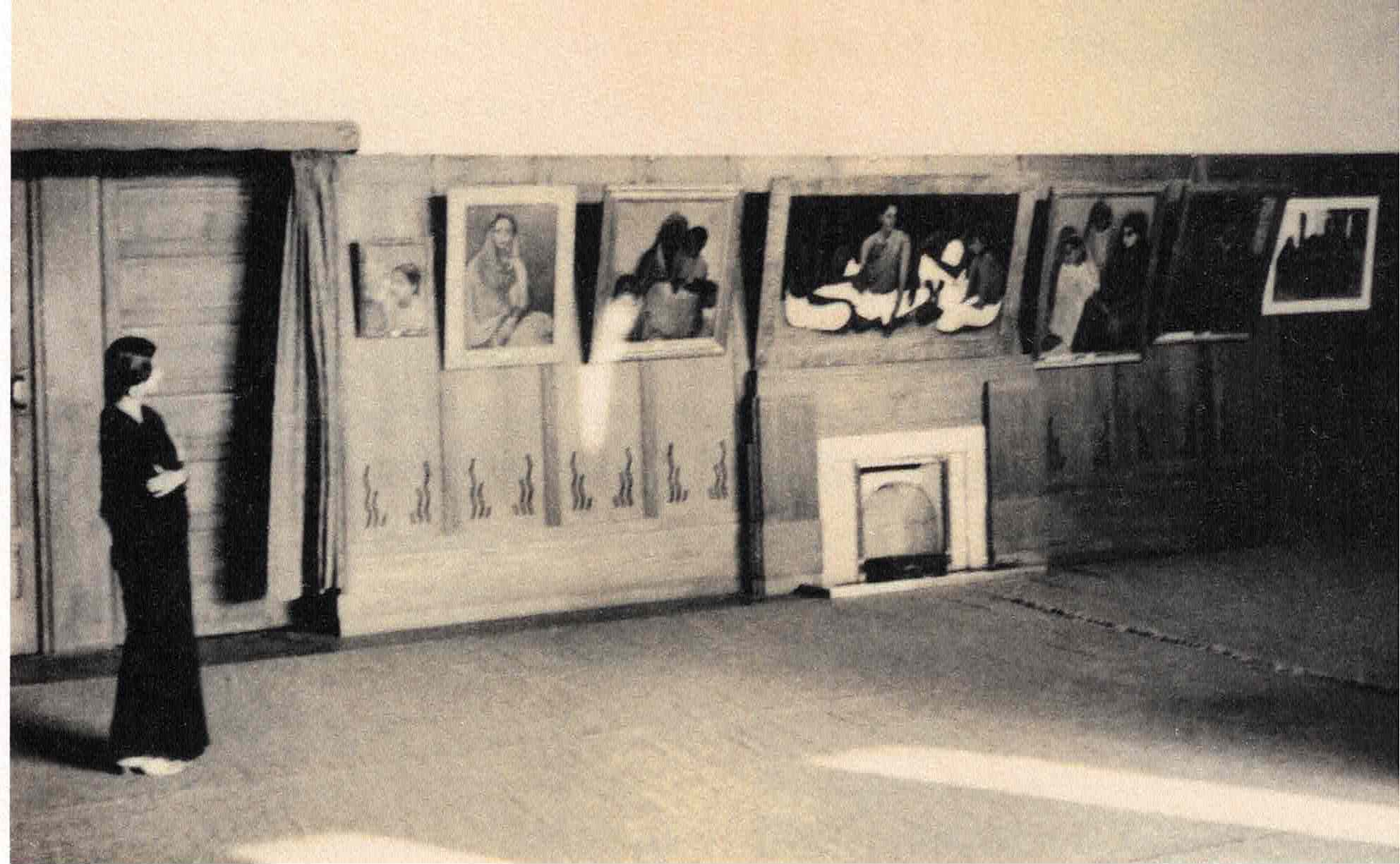
Amrita Sher-Gil at her 1937 Lahore Exhibition with Brahmacharis

== See also ==
- List of paintings by Amrita Sher-Gil

== Bibliography ==
- Dalmia, Yashodhara (2013). Amrita Sher-Gil: A Life. Gurugram: Penguin Books. ISBN 978-0-14-342026-2.
- Sundaram, Vivan (2010). Amrita Sher-Gil: A Self-Portrait in Letters and Writings. Vol. 1. New Delhi: Tulika Books. pp. 1–417. ISBN 978-81-89487-59-1.
- Sundaram, Vivan (2010). Amrita Sher-Gil: A Self-Portrait in Letters and Writings. Vol. 2. New Delhi: Tulika Books. pp. 418–821. ISBN 978-81-89487-59-1.
