= Radhika Iyengar =

Indian journalist and writer

- Education: Columbia University Graduate School of Journalism, New York City
- Occupation: Journalist
- Writing career
- Notable work: Fire on the Ganges (2023)
- Website: Official website

Radhika Iyengar is an Indian journalist, writer, and recipient of the 2018 Red Ink Awards in the category of human rights. She held the Prabha Dutt Fellowship in 2016, the Bianca Pancoat Patton Fellowship in 2019, and the Charles Wallace India Trust fellowship in 2020. She has written for several news magazines including Al Jazeera, Christian Science Monitor, Vogue India, and Conde Nast Traveller India. After seven to eight years of research on the Dom community of Varanasi, she produced Fire on the Ganges: Life among the Dead in Banaras, published in 2023 by HarperCollins.
