= Three Girls (painting) =

1935 painting by Amrita Sher-Gil

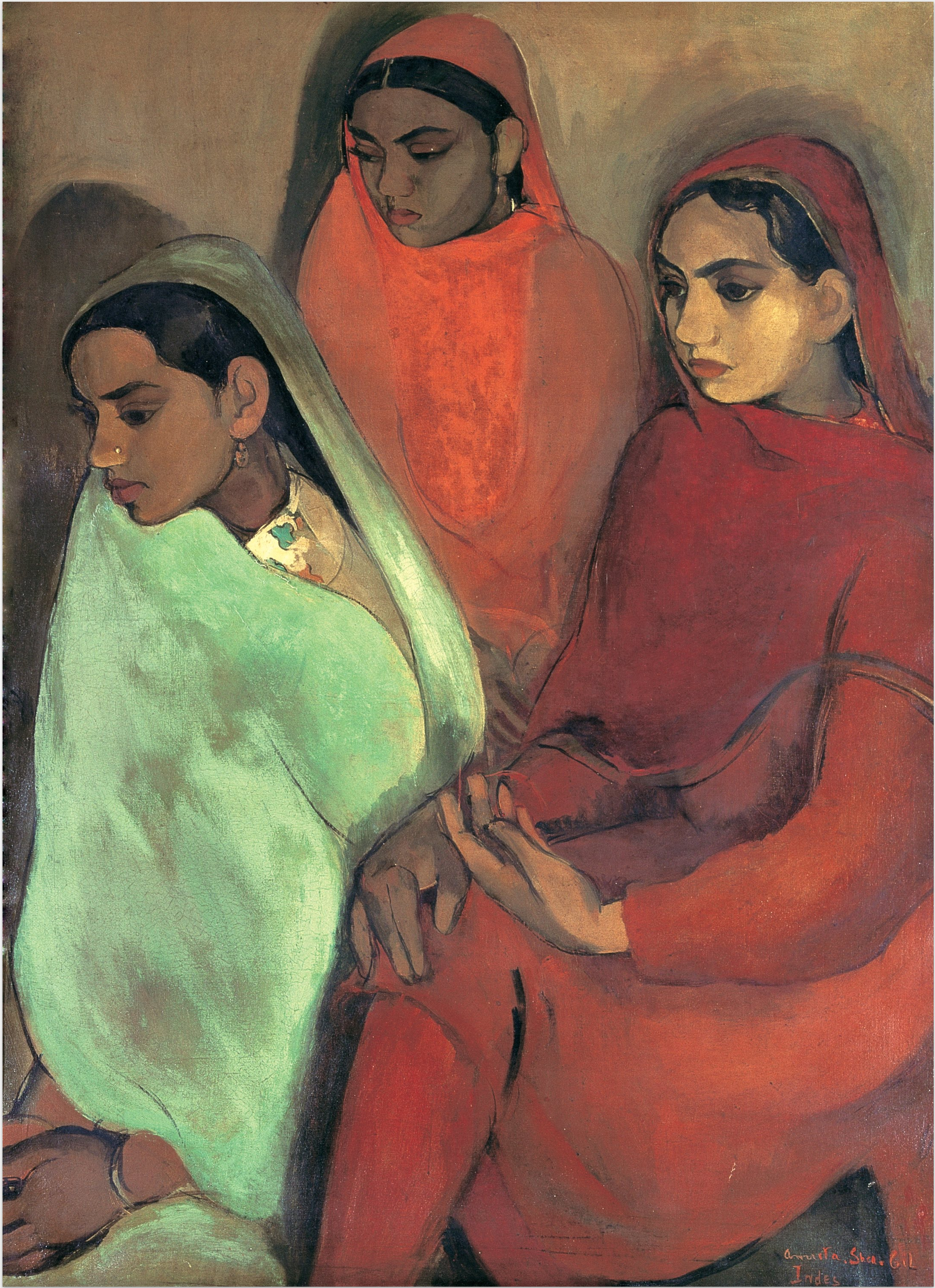
- Left to right: Nirveer Kaur (Nairy), Beant Kaur and Harbhajan Kaur (Sando)
- Artist: Amrita Sher-Gil
- Year: 1935
- Medium: Oil on canvas
- Dimensions: 92.5 cm × 66.6 cm (36.4 in × 26.2 in)
- Location: National Gallery of Modern Art, New Delhi

Three Girls, also known as Group of Young Girls, is a painting by Hungarian-Indian artist Amrita Sher-Gil. It was painted in 1935 shortly after Sher-Gil returned to India from Europe in 1934. The painting won the Gold Medal at the annual exhibition of the Bombay Art Society in 1937. The painting was part of a batch sent to Nawab Salar Jang of Hyderabad who later rejected them all.

== Composition ==
The painting portrays the three daughters of Mahinder (Mahindro) Kaur (1897-1939), daughter of Sundar Singh Majithia, and Mangal Singh Mann of Koschera (1891-1966); Nirveer Kaur (Nairy) (1914-1975), Beant Kaur (1915-1990), and Harbhajan Kaur (Sando) (1919-1957).

== Interpretation ==
The painting shows three colourfully dressed women contemplating a destiny they are unable to change. Amrita Sher-Gil did not sensualise her women but instead portrayed them as facing great adversity yet having the spirit to transcend a destiny that they were unable to change.

Sher-Gil wrote:

I realized my real artistic mission, to interpret the life of Indians and particularly the poor Indians pictorially; to paint those silent images of infinite submission and patience,... to reproduce on canvas the impression those sad eyes created on me.

The painting reflects the influence of the works of French painter Paul Gauguin on Sher-Gil's work. It also marks Sher-Gil's move from an earlier academic and realist style of painting that she had learned in Paris towards a flatter style with modern compositions, where line and colour are prominently used. In Three Girls, the girls' surrounding is not shown. Their situation is made evident through their facial expressions, their body language, and the skillful use of tones.

== Response ==
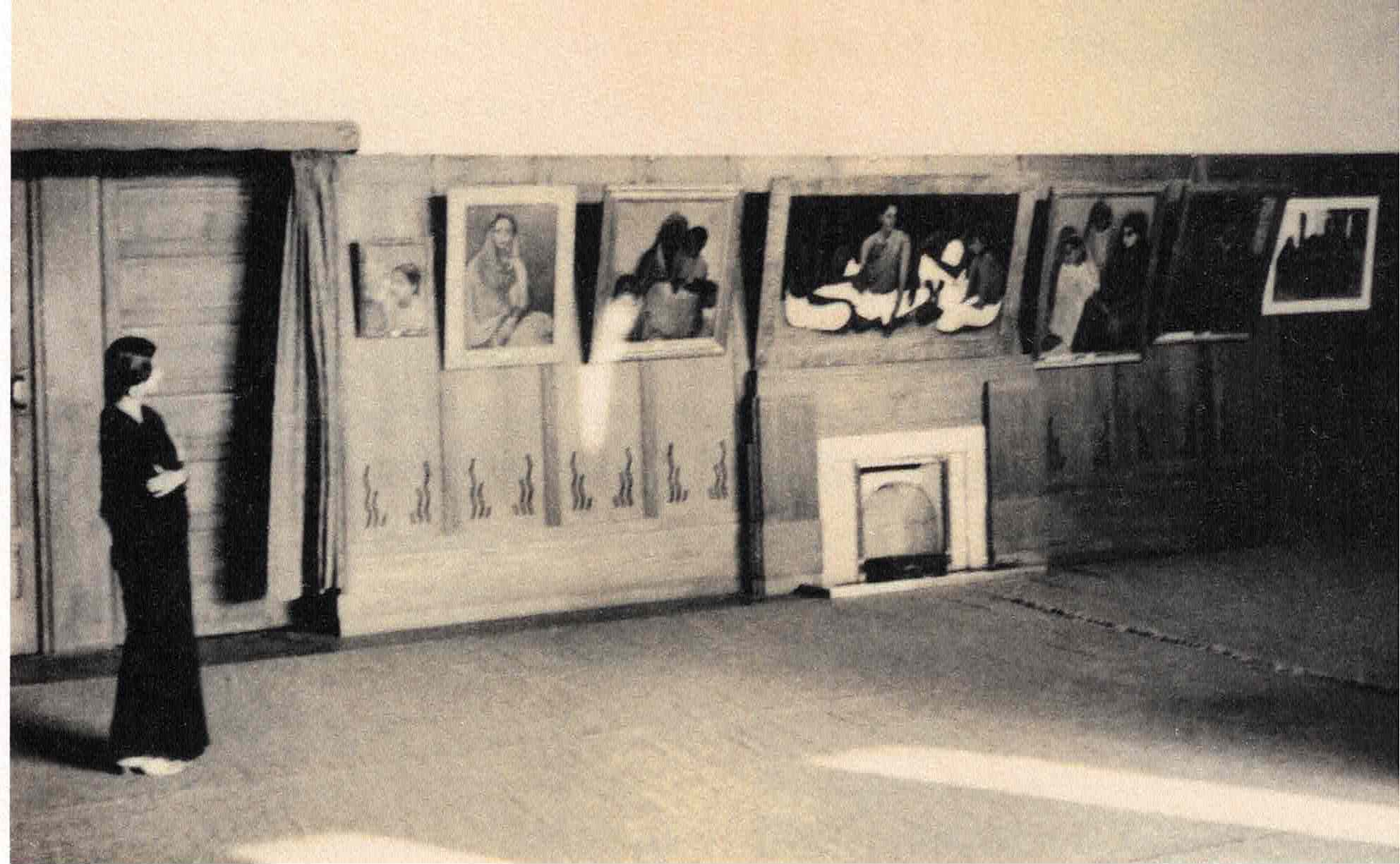
Amrita Sher-Gil at her 1937 Lahore Exhibition with Three Girls

In December 1936 the painting was displayed at the exhibition at Public Gardens, Hyderabad. There, the wealthy art collector, Nawab Salar Jung, requested that it be delivered to him, along with the Nude of Indu. Hoping that he would purchase it, Sher-Gil also sent him Villagers, and extended her visit, but he returned it, commenting that he had "no use for these Cubist pictures".

The painting won the Gold Medal at the annual exhibition of the Bombay Art Society in 1937. It was the eleventh of 33 of Sher-Gil's works displayed at her solo her solo exhibition at Faletti's Hotel in Lahore, British India, held from 21 to 27 November 1937. There, it was priced at ₹700.

== See also ==
- List of paintings by Amrita Sher-Gil

== Bibliography ==
- Dalmia, Yashodhara (2013). Amrita Sher-Gil: A Life. Gurugram: Penguin Books. ISBN 978-0-14-342026-2.
- Sundaram, Vivan (2010). Amrita Sher-Gil: A Self-Portrait in Letters and Writings. Vol. 1. New Delhi: Tulika Books. pp. 1–417. ISBN 978-81-89487-59-1.
- Sundaram, Vivan (2010). Amrita Sher-Gil: A Self-Portrait in Letters and Writings. Vol. 2. New Delhi: Tulika Books. pp. 418–821. ISBN 978-81-89487-59-1.
