= K. N. Sitaram =

K. N. Sitaram (1889–1940) was the first Indian to head the Central Museum, Lahore, British India (now Pakistan), as successor to John Lockwood Kipling. His contribution to Indian history and arts were outstanding. He had a large personal collection of Indian arts and artifacts which he gave to Central Museum, Lahore. He travelled widely, and was involved in re-indexing the artifacts at Buckingham Palace, London. Sitaram claimed to know 21 languages.

He was conferred the title of Pandit since he was an authority in Sanskrit. He was a native of Ambasamudram, Tirunelveli District, Tamil Nadu state of India.

While he was enrolled at Kings' College, Oxford, in the early 1920s, where he did his Ph.D. in history, Sitaram married an English woman named Ethel. They had a son, Krishna Sitaram, born in May 1925.

Growing differences between Ethel and Sitaram led to their divorced, though Krishnan Sitaram continued his correspondence with his father until he died in September 1940. Dr. Sitaram later married the daughter of the eldest son of Zamorin of Calicut, Kerala. He had two sons by this marriage, Ramachandran and Chandrashekar.

== Works ==
K. N. Sitaram had strong beliefs concerning Indo-Iranian ties from Vedic times. His article Iranian Influence on Indian Culture was published by the journal of the K. R. Cama Oriental Institute in 1923. There he referred to passages in the Vedas, the 18 Puranas and Zend Avesta, pointing out similarities in names, places and rituals which resembled each other. He created his own school holding that Pallavas of Tamil Nadu were originally from Pahlavis of Iran.

He also brought out a book The Zoroastrian Magi in the Bhavishya Purana published by the Zoroastrial Historical Conference Committee. Two other articles by Sitaram are Indian Art & English Friends published in The Indian Review brought out by The Theosophical Society, Adayar in December 1925 and 'Dramatic Dance Representations in South India' published by Royal Asiatic Society in April 1922.

Ms. Ethel

Krishan Sitaram

== Manuscripts ==
21 Manuscripts of Dr. K. N. Sitaram are available both at the British Library, London and National Archives, Surrey. Interested readers can go through the below list of articles by Dr. K. N. Sitaram and obtain a copy from any of these places after paying the requisite fee.

1. Typescript of "Studies in Indian Art" c1920-30
2. Typescript of "Studies in Indian Art" Parts I and II "Introduction" c1920-30
3. Typescript of "Studies in Indian Art" Part III " Indian Sculpture" c1920-30
4. Typescript of "Studies in Indian Art" Part IV "Indian Dancing" c1920-30
5. Typescript of "Studies in Indian Art" Part V "Indian Architecture" c1920-30
6. Typescript of "Indian Sculpture" c1920-30
7. Typescript of "Indian Architecture" c1920-30
8. Manuscript of "The Ramayana in Indian and Indonesian Art" c1920-35
9. Typescript of "The Ramayana in Indian Art" c1920-35
10. Typescript of "The Ramayana in Indonesian Art" c1920-35
11. Typescript of "The Ramayana in Indian and Indonesian Art" c1920-35
12. Manuscript of "Muslim Painting" c1920-35
13. Typescript of "Muslim Painting" c1920-35
14. Manuscript of "Islamic Contribution To Indian Art" c1920-35
15. Typescript of "Islamic Contribution To Indian Art" c1920-35
16. Typescript of "Social Life In The Age Of The Mauryas" c1920-35
17. Manuscript of "The Antiquities Of The Kangra Valley" c1922
18. Typescript of "The Antiquities Of The Kangra Valley" c1922
19. Manuscript of a catalogue of the Amaravati sculptures in the British Museum c1935-36
20. Notes on the acquisitions of the Central Museum, Lahore c1920-30
21. Notes on the temples at Kidnapore c1920-30
