= Katalin Keserü =

Hungarian artist (born 1946)

- Keserü Katalin
- Born: 1946 (age 79–80); Pécs, Hungary
- Education: Eötvös Loránd University

Katalin Keserü (born 4 October 1946 in Pécs, Hungary) is a Hungarian award-winning artist and professor emeritus (since 2013) in the Department of Art History at Faculty of Humanities of the Eötvös Loránd University. From 2000 to 2006, she was managing director of the Ernst Museum in Budapest.

== Education ==
- Master of Arts: Art History, 1975 Eötvös Loránd University, Budapest.
- PhD: History of Art, 1995, Eötvös University, Budapest
- Habilitation: art history, 2003, Eötvös University, Budapest

== Awards ==
- 1990: Mihály Munkácsy Prize (hu:Munkácsy Mihály-díj)
- 1992: Noémi Ferenczy Prize (hu:Ferenczy Noémi-díj)
- 2007: Széchenyi Prize
- 2010: Prima Award (hu:Prima-díj)
