= Bride's Toilet =

1937 painting by Amrita Sher-Gil

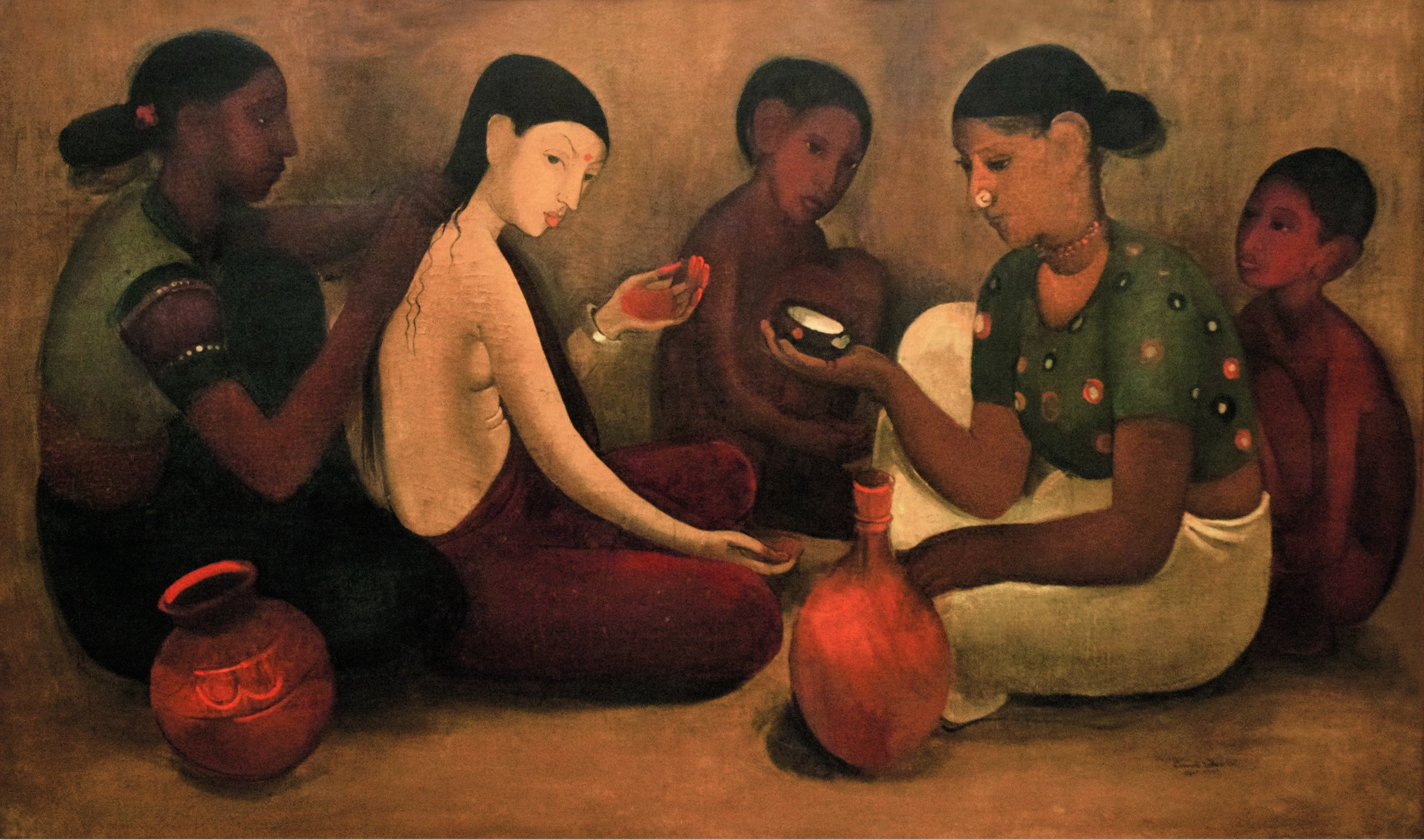
- Artist: Amrita Sher-Gil
- Year: 1937
- Medium: Oil on canvas
- Dimensions: 88.8 cm × 146 cm (35.0 in × 57 in)
- Location: National Gallery of Modern Art, New Delhi

Bride's Toilet is an oil on canvas painting, painted by Hungarian-Indian artist Amrita Sher-Gil (1913–1941) in 1937.

A work of modernism, the painting draws influence from the frescoes of Ajanta and the miniatures of Mughal art, thereby resulting in a masterful amalgam of Indian and European styles. Part of Sher-Gil's well known South Indian trilogy, comprising also Brahmacharis and South Indian Villagers Going to Market, Bride's Toilet explores the simplicity and uniqueness of rural life, a recurring subject in her later paintings. When Sher-Gil returned to India in 1934, her approach towards art changed significantly. A number of later artworks revolved around the poor and the underprivileged, the commonfolk and their struggles.

Bride's Toilet depicts a bride's chamber, wherein a young light-skinned woman, presumably the titular bride, is seated. She is half-naked; her palms are covered in mehndi. She is surrounded by two other women and two children. One of the women is dressing her hair, and the other is holding a container. Their faces are expressionless. The painting employs a rich, colourful palette. Tones have been skilfully used. The painting demonstrates Sher-Gil's curious interest in women, their lives and adversities.

The painting was one of 33 of Sher-Gil's works displayed at her solo exhibition at Faletti's Hotel in Lahore, British India, held from 21 to 27 November 1937.

== See also ==
- List of paintings by Amrita Sher-Gil
