= Diwan Chaman Lall =

Indian politician and diplomat

Member of Rajya Sabha
- In office 1952–1958

1st Indian Ambassador to Turkey
- In office 1948–1949
- Preceded by: Office Establish
- Succeeded by: C.S.Jha

Member of Punjab Legislative Assembly
- In office 1937–1945
- Preceded by: Office Establish
- Succeeded by: Daud Ghaznavi
- Constituency: Eastern Punjab

Member of Central Legislative Assembly
- In office 1924–1931
- Preceded by: Dr. Nand Lal
- Constituency: West Punjab

Member of Constituent Assembly
- In office 1946–1948
- President: Rajendra Prasad

Personal details
- Born: Chaman Lall; 30 October 1892
- Died: 12 November 1973 (aged 81)
- Party: Indian National Congress
- Spouse: Helen Khan
- Children: 3
- Parent: Dewan Bahadur Daulat Rai (father)
- Occupation: Politician, diplomat

Diwan Chaman Lall (30 October 1892 – 12 November 1973) was an Indian politician and diplomat who served as a Member of the Rajya Sabha.

== Early life ==
Chaman Lall was born on 30 October 1892 to Dewan Bahadur Daulat Rai. He received an honors degree in jurisprudence from Jesus College, Oxford, later called to the bar at Middle Temple in London. He worked a journalist, first for the art and literature quarterly magazine Coterie, in London, then as editor and Chief Leader Writer for the newspaper The Bombay Chronicle.

== In freedom movement ==
Lall was a founder and first general secretary of the All India Trade Union Congress in 1920, later becoming its President in 1927. He established himself as a leader of workers' unions, serving as president of the Federation of Posts and Telegraphs Union, All India telegraph Workmen's Union, All India Postal and R.M.S. Union, All India Press Workers' Union, NWFP Railway Workmen's Union and the EP Railway Union. Lall was a member of the Royal Commission on Labour in India during 1929–30. He recommended that the working hours of industrial workers be reduced and that minimum age for employment at factories be raised to 13 years. He also suggested that the government take steps towards it in conformity with the 1921 Convention that dealt with the same. He represented workers' interests at the first Round Table Conference in 1930–31. Lall served as delegate at the International Labour Organization conference in Geneva and led India's delegation at the 1946 Montreal Conference.

As a politician, Lall served as a member of the Central Legislative Assembly first from 1924 to 1931, and then between 1944 and 1946. From 1937 to 1945, he served as member of the Punjab Legislative Assembly from Eastern Punjab constituency reserved for Trade and Labour Unions. In 1946, Lall became a member of the Constituent Assembly of India before he resigned in two years later.

=== Constitution making ===
In 1946, Chaman Lall was elected to the Constituent Assembly from East Punjab representing the All-India Trade Union Congress party. However, he resigned after two years. He spoke on voting rights of people who migrated to India after the partition.

During his tenure in constitutional assembly, contribute by working in Committees of the Constituent Assembly: Steering Committee and Provincial Constitution Committee.

== Global policy ==
He was one of the signatories of the agreement to convene a convention for drafting a world constitution. As a result, for the first time in human history, a World Constituent Assembly convened to draft and adopt the Constitution for the Federation of Earth.

== After Independence ==
He served as India's 1st Ambassador to Turkey from 1948 to 1950. Lall was Member of Rajya Sabha for three consecutive term 1952 to 1968.

During his tenure, as a Rajya Sabha member, Lall introduced a private member bill to amend provisions on obscenity in the Indian Penal Code (1963). He proposed in the bill, to exempt works of art, or publications meant for research, science or literature from the applicability of obscenity provisions. The amendment was passed in 1969.

== Personal life ==
He married Helen Khan and they had one son, Rahul. His two other sons were Prakash and Navin Prakash.

== Bibliography ==
- Lall, D. Chaman (1932). Coolie: The Story of Labour and Capital in India. Oriental Publishing House.
