= Faletti's Hotel =

Hotel in Lahore, Pakistan

Coordinates: 31.5614°N 74.3278°E

General information
- Status: Re-opened in June 2013 after undergoing major refurbishment
- Type: Hotel
- Location: Lahore-54020, Pakistan
- Completed: 1880
- Opening: 1880

Height
- Architectural: British Colonial

Technical details
- Floor count: 2
- Floor area: 1,695.4 m2 (18,249 sq ft)

Other information
- Number of rooms: 44

Website
- https://falettishotel.com

Faletti's Hotel is a historical hotel in Lahore, Pakistan, which was opened in 1880 during the British Raj by an Italian, Giovanni Faletti. It was closed in the late 1990s for privatisation and re-opened in June 2013 after undergoing a major refurbishment.

From its 1880 opening until the establishment of modern 5-star hotels in Pakistan in the 1970s, Faletti's was considered to be the most prestigious hotel in Pakistan.

== Location ==
Faletti's is situated in Lahore, Pakistan's second largest city and the provincial capital of Pakistan's Punjab province. Lahore is also known as the cultural and literary capital of Pakistan.

Faletti's is situated in a leafy triangular piece of land in the heart of downtown Lahore adjacent to the Provincial Assembly of the Punjab Building just off Lahore's famous and historical boulevard, "The Mall." This hotel is only 15 minutes drive from the Lahore Airport.

It is bound by the following:

- North: Cooper Road
- South: Service Road
- East: Egerton Road
- West: Punjab Provincial Assembly Building

== Size ==
Faletti's covers a total area of 33,700 m^{2} (363,000 sq ft), including a built-up area of approximately 1,695.4 m^{2} (18,249 sq ft). ft. It has 38 residential executive rooms and suites, 4 banquet halls, 3 board rooms and 2 restaurants.

== Architecture ==
Faletti's was built in the British colonial architecture style of the late 19th century. Its interior walls and floors are decorated by Burmese teak wood and its finely manicured lawns have centuries old trees.

Faletti's Hotel is protected property under "The Punjab Special Premises (Preservation) Ordinance, 1985."

== Events held ==
In February 2017, Lahore Literary Festival was held at Faletti's Hotel.

In December 2017, many local fashion designers held a glamorous night of models walking the ramp at Faletti's Hotel.

In June 2020, when all the world was affected by COVID-19, Speaker Punjab Assembly Ch. Pervaiz Elahi decided to take sessions in Faletti's Hotel for the very first time in the history of Pakistan.

== Famous guests ==
Famous guests at Faletti's include the Founding fathers of Pakistan, Mohammad Ali Jinnah & Lord Malhi. Hollywood actors Ava Gardner and Stewart Granger, Hollywood director George Cukor, Pakistani Prime Minister Zulfiqar Ali Bhutto, Hollywood actor Marlon Brando, West Indies cricketer Sir Garfield Sobers and the Chief Justice of Pakistan, A.R. Cornelius.

In 1955, Ava Gardner stayed at Room 55 in Faletti's for almost three months (22 February 1955 to May 1955) while shooting for the film Bhowani Junction. Faletti's renamed Room 55 as "Ava Gardner Suite" in memory of the actress.

Marlon Brando stayed at Faletti's when he visited Lahore on 25 February 1967. He was visiting Pakistan on behalf of UNICEF to enlist the participation of Pakistani artistes in an international gala variety show to be held later in the year at the UN General Assembly in New York to raise funds for UNICEF. During his stay at Faletti's, Brando also gave a press conference in his hotel suite.

The rooms in which Mohammad Ali Jinnah (Room 18) and Justice A.R. Cornelius (Room 2) stayed were also renamed after their famous occupants. Jinnah stayed at Faletti's when he came to Lahore to argue the appeal of Ghazi Ilm-ud-Din Shaheed before the Lahore High Court in July 1929. Justice A.R. Cornelius took up residence at Faletti's for 40 years and lived there until he died in 1991.

== Privatization ==
Prior to Faletti's privatization, the government-owned Pakistan Tourism Development Corporation (PTDC) held 86.8% shares in Faletti's holding company, Associated Hotels of Pakistan (AHP), whereas private investors held the balance at 13.2%. Since 1992, AHP Limited hotels, namely Faletti's Hotel Lahore, Flashman's Hotel Rawalpindi, Dean's Hotel Peshawar and Cecil Hotel Murree, were on a 50-year lease to PTDC at an annual lease rental of Rs. 1 million only.

Pakistan's Privatization Commission initiated the privatization process on 21 August 1997 and put up the hotel for privatization in April/May 2002. Due to the poor market response, the hotel was again put up for sale in December 2003 and was finally privatized in 2004 after Four Brothers Marketing (Pvt.) Ltd. put in the highest and successful bid at Rs. 1.211 billion.

In February 2006, Four Brothers Marketing (Pvt.) Ltd. sold Faletti's Hotel to a US company, Morganti Group, Inc., based in Abu Dhabi. The current owner of Faletti's Hotel is Chaudhry Munir from Rahim Yar Khan, Pakistan. His son Chaudhry Raheel Munir is an executive director of the hotel.
