= 1930 in art =

Events from the year 1930 in art.

== Events ==
- June–July – Christopher Wood paints in Brittany.
- 29 November – Première of the Surrealist film L'Age d'Or by Luis Buñuel (co-written with Salvador Dalí) at Studio 28 in Paris.
- Theo van Doesburg produces a "Manifesto of Concrete art".
- Vanessa Bell and Duncan Grant complete the decoration of the dining room for Dorothy Wellesley at Penns-in-the-Rocks, Withyham, England.
- Malvina Hoffman begins sculpting life-size figures for the Field Museum's Hall of Man.
- Great Bardfield Artists community established in England.
- Bernard Berenson publishes The Italian Painters of the Renaissance.
- Milt Gross publishes his wordless novel He Done Her Wrong in the United States.
- Soviet sale of Hermitage paintings begins.
- Spanish postage stamps depict Goya's La maja desnuda.
- Approximate date – Gertrud Arndt begins a series of photographic self-portraits at the Bauhaus.

== Awards ==
- Archibald Prize: W. B. McInnes – Drum-Major Harry McClelland

== Exhibitions ==
- April – Cercle et Carré exhibition opens at Galerie 23 in the Rue La Boétie, Paris.

== Works ==
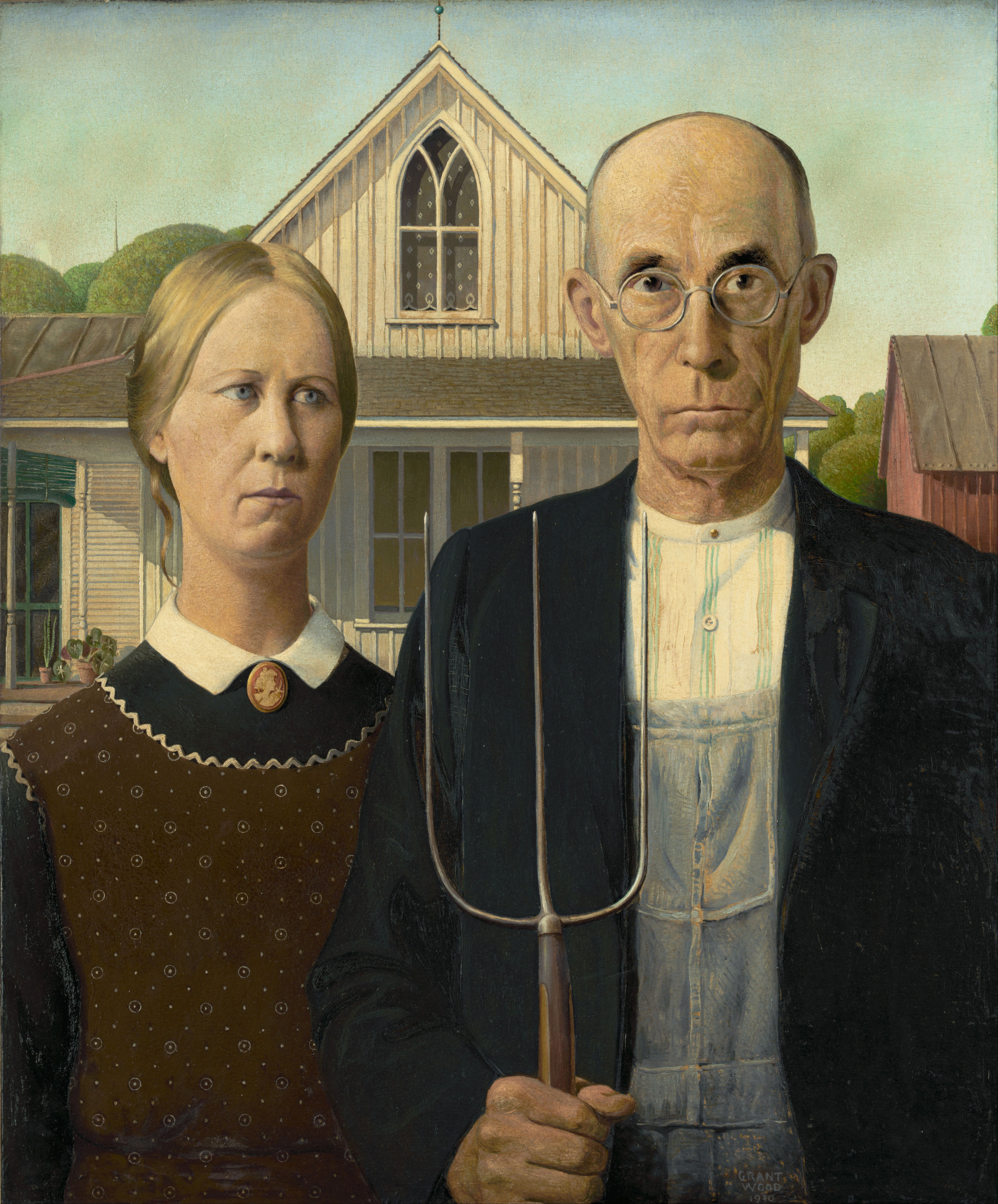
Grant Wood – American Gothic

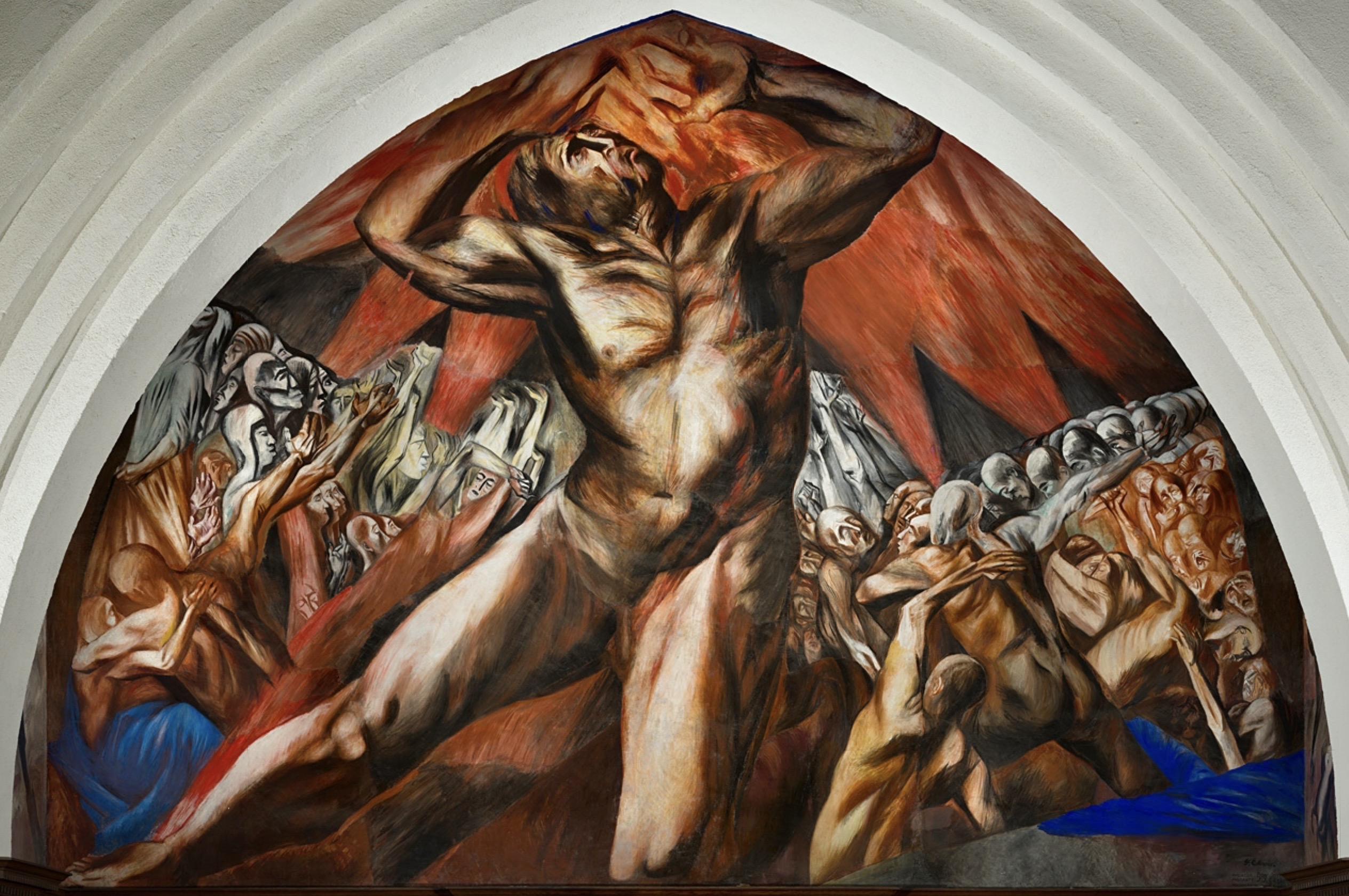
José Clemente Orozco – Prometheus

- Edward Bawden and Eric Ravilious – Mural in refectory of Morley College, London (begun 1928; destroyed in The Blitz 1940)
- Pierre Bonnard – Pots
- Patrick Henry Bruce – Peinture (Museum of Modern Art, New York)
- Edward Burra – The Snack Bar
- John Steuart Curry – Hogs Killing a Snake
- Theo van Doesburg – Arithmetic Composition
- Raoul Dufy – Pink Nude
- M. C. Escher
  - The Bridge (lithograph)
  - Castrovalva (lithograph)
  - Palizzi, Calabria (woodcut)
  - Pentedattilo, Calabria (lithograph)
  - Street in Scanno, Abruzzi (lithograph)
- Thomas Cooper Gotch – The Exile: Heavy Is The Price I Paid For Love
- James Guthrie – Statesmen of World War I
- Edward Hopper – Early Sunday Morning
- Augustus John – Portrait of Tallulah Bankhead
- Paul Klee – Has Head, Hand, Feet and Heart
- Rozsa Klein (Rogi André) – Bonnard's Palette
- Helmut Kolle
  - Self-Portrait in Hunting Attire
  - Young Man with a Colored Scarf
- Abel Lafleur – Victory (trophy)
- Fernand Léger – Mona Lisa with Keys
- L. S. Lowry – Coming from the Mill
- Jeanne Mammen – Free Room
- Henri Matisse – The Back Series (bas-reliefs)
- Piet Mondrian - Composition with Red, Blue and Yellow
- Alice Neel – Ethel Ashton (nude portrait)
- C.R.W. Nevinson
  - Amongst the Nerves of the World
  - Any Wintry Afternoon in England
- Georgia O'Keeffe – Rust Red Hills
- José Clemente Orozco – Prometheus (fresco at Pomona College, California)
- Diego Rivera – History of Morelos, Conquest and Revolution
- Charles Sheeler – American Landscape
- T. F. Šimon – View in Old Prague (woodcut)
- Grace Cossington Smith – The Bridge in Curve
- Herbert Tyson Smith – bronze reliefs for Liverpool Cenotaph
- Sophie Taeuber-Arp – Composition of Circles and Overlapping Angles
- Sam Tate, James Watt – Oglethorpe Monument
- Edward Trumbull – Transport and Human Endeavor (ceiling mural, lobby, Chrysler Building, New York City)
- Suzanne Valadon – Nude Woman with a Blue Shawl
- Christopher Wood
  - Anemones in a Cornish Window
  - Zebra and Parachute
- Grant Wood
  - American Gothic
  - Arnold Comes of Age
  - Stone City, Iowa
- N. C. Wyeth – Reception to Washington on April 21, 1789, at Trenton on his way to New York to Assume the Duties of the Presidency of the United States
- W. L. Wyllie – Panorama of the Battle of Trafalgar (Royal Naval Museum, Portsmouth)
- Xu Beihong – A Portrait of Sun Duoci
- Statler Fountain

== Births ==
=== January to June ===
- 15 January – Paul Ahyi, Togolese artist and sculptor (d. 2010)
- 26 January – Napoleon Abueva, Filipino sculptor (d. 2018)
- 3 February – Gillian Ayres, English abstract painter (d. 2018)
- 10 February – Eva Frankfurther, German-born portrait painter (suicide 1959)
- 13 February – Ernst Fuchs, Austrian artist (d. 2015)
- 18 February – Gahan Wilson, American cartoonist (d. 2019)
- 21 February – Enrique Tábara, Ecuadorian painter (d. 2021)
- 24 February – Anita Steckel, American feminist artist (d. 2012)
- 25 February – Wendy Beckett, English contemplative nun and art historian (d. 2018)
- 7 March – Antony Armstrong-Jones, English photographer (d. 2017)
- 8 March – Hector Lombana, Colombian sculptor, painter and architect (d. 2008)
- 11 March – David Gentleman, English graphic designer
- 27 March – Daniel Spoerri, Romanian-Swiss artist and writer
- 30 March – Rolf Harris, Australian entertainer, painter and child sexual abuser (d. 2023)
- 31 March – Susan Weil, American painter
- 1 April – John Houston, Scottish painter (d. 2008)
- 12 April – Manuel Neri, American sculptor, painter and printmaker (d. 2021)
- 14 May – James Beck, American art historian (d. 2007)
- 15 May – Jasper Johns, American painter, sculptor and printmaker
- 22 May – Marisol Escobar, French-born sculptor and printmaker (d.2016)
- 23 May
  - Richard Anuszkiewicz, American painter, sculptor and printmaker (d. 2020)
  - Aslan, French-born pin-up artist (d.2014)
- 24 May – Unity Spencer, English artist (d. 2017)
- 30 May – Robert Ryman, American monochrome painter (d. 2019)
- 5 June – Vladimir Popov, Soviet animator, animation and art director (d. 1987)
- 15 June – Ikuo Hirayama, Japanese painter (d. 2009)
- 16 June – Allan D'Arcangelo, American painter and graphic artist (d. 1998)
- 19 June – Bryan Kneale, Manx sculptor and academic
- 20 June – Magdalena Abakanowicz, Polish sculptor (d. 2017)
- 24 June
  - Pierre Restany, French art critic and cultural philosopher (d. 2003)
  - Flip Schulke, American photojournalist (d. 2008)

=== July to December ===
- 4 July – Mohamed Demagh, Algerian sculptor (d. 2018)
- 4 August - Astrid Zydower, German-born British sculptor (d. 2005)
- 5 September – Ibrahim El-Salahi, Sudanese painter
- 24 September – Bernard Nevill, English textile designer and art collector (d. 2019)
- 28 September – Nikolai Pozdneev, Russian painter (d. 1978)
- 3 October – Robyn Denny, British abstract artist (d. 2014)
- 7 October – Kurt Dornis, German painter, graphic artist and draughtsman
- 8 October – Faith Ringgold, African American painter and fabric artist
- 18 October – Trevor Bell, English painter (d. 2017)
- 29 October – Niki de Saint Phalle, French sculptor, painter and film maker (d. 2002)
- 7 November – Robert Natkin, American painter (d. 2010)
- 13 November – Benny Andrews, American painter and academic (d. 2006)
- 14 November – Elisabeth Frink, English sculptor (d. 1993)
- 31 December – Luis Marsans, Catalan painter (d. 2015)

== Deaths ==
- January 7 – Max Schmalzl, German religious painter and illustrator (b. 1850)
- March 3 – W. W. Quatremain, English landscape painter (b. 1857)
- March 19 – Andreas Walser, Swiss painter (b. 1908)
- March 24 – Eugeen Van Mieghem, Belgian painter (b. 1875)
- April 17 – Aleksandr Golovin, Russian stage designer (b. 1863)
- April 30 – John Russell, Australian Impressionist painter (b. 1858)
- May 10 – Julio Romero de Torres, Spanish painter (b. 1874)
- May 28 – George Washington Lambert, Australian portrait painter and war artist (b. 1873)
- June 3 – Alexander Bogomazov, Ukrainian painter and modern art theoretician of Russian avant-garde (b. 1880)
- June 5
  - Sophie Holten, Danish painter (b. 1858)
  - Jules Pascin, Bulgarian-born painter and draftsman (b. 1885)
- July 22 – Wacław Szymanowski, Polish sculptor and painter (b. 1859)
- August 21 – Christopher Wood, English painter (b. 1901) (suicide)
- August 28 – Stanisław Bergman, Polish painter (b. 1862)
- September 6 – Sir James Guthrie, Scottish painter (b. 1859)
- September 24 – Otto Mueller, German Expressionist painter (b. 1874)
- September 25 – Abram Arkhipov, Russian painter (b. 1862)
- September 29 – Ilya Yefimovich Repin, Russian painter (b. 1844)
- December 9 – Laura Muntz Lyall, Canadian Impressionist painter (b. 1860)
- December 17 – Nikolay Kasatkin, Russian painter (b. 1859)
- December 28 – Antonio Mancini, Italian painter (b. 1852)
- date unknown – Peter Moog, outsider artist (b. 1871)

== See also ==
- 1930 in fine arts of the Soviet Union
