= List of paintings by Amrita Sher-Gil =

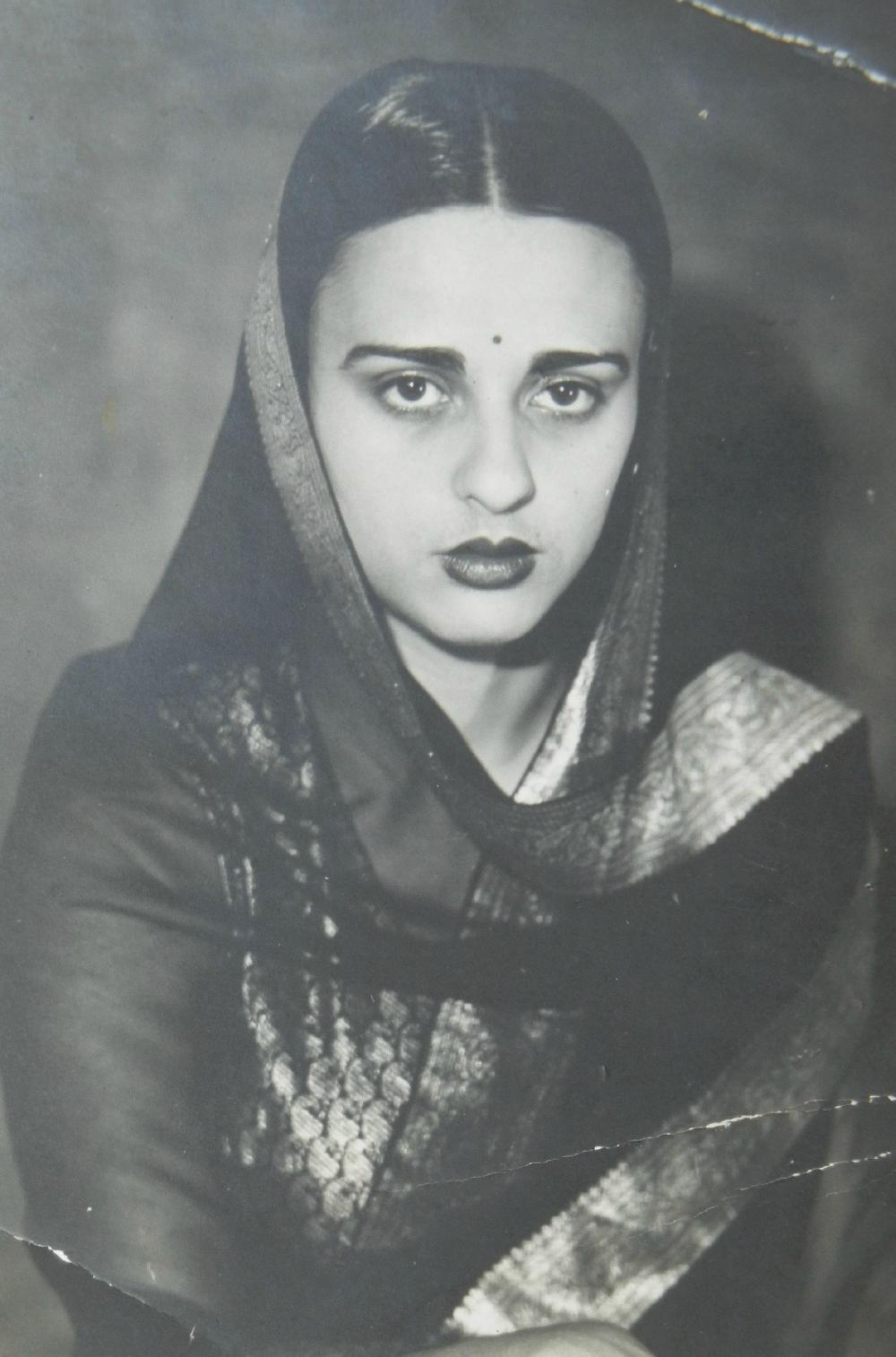
Amrita Sher-Gil

This is a list of paintings by Hungarian-Indian artist Amrita Sher-Gil (1913–1941). Over 60 of her paintings, of which most were portraits and self-portraits, were created between 1930 and 1932 in Hungary and France. 19 were self-portraits painted in Europe between 1930 and 1934, and two, including one in a blue sari, were later completed in India. Several of her paintings were of nudes; some of herself and others based on models of which most were female.

== 1929-1933 ==
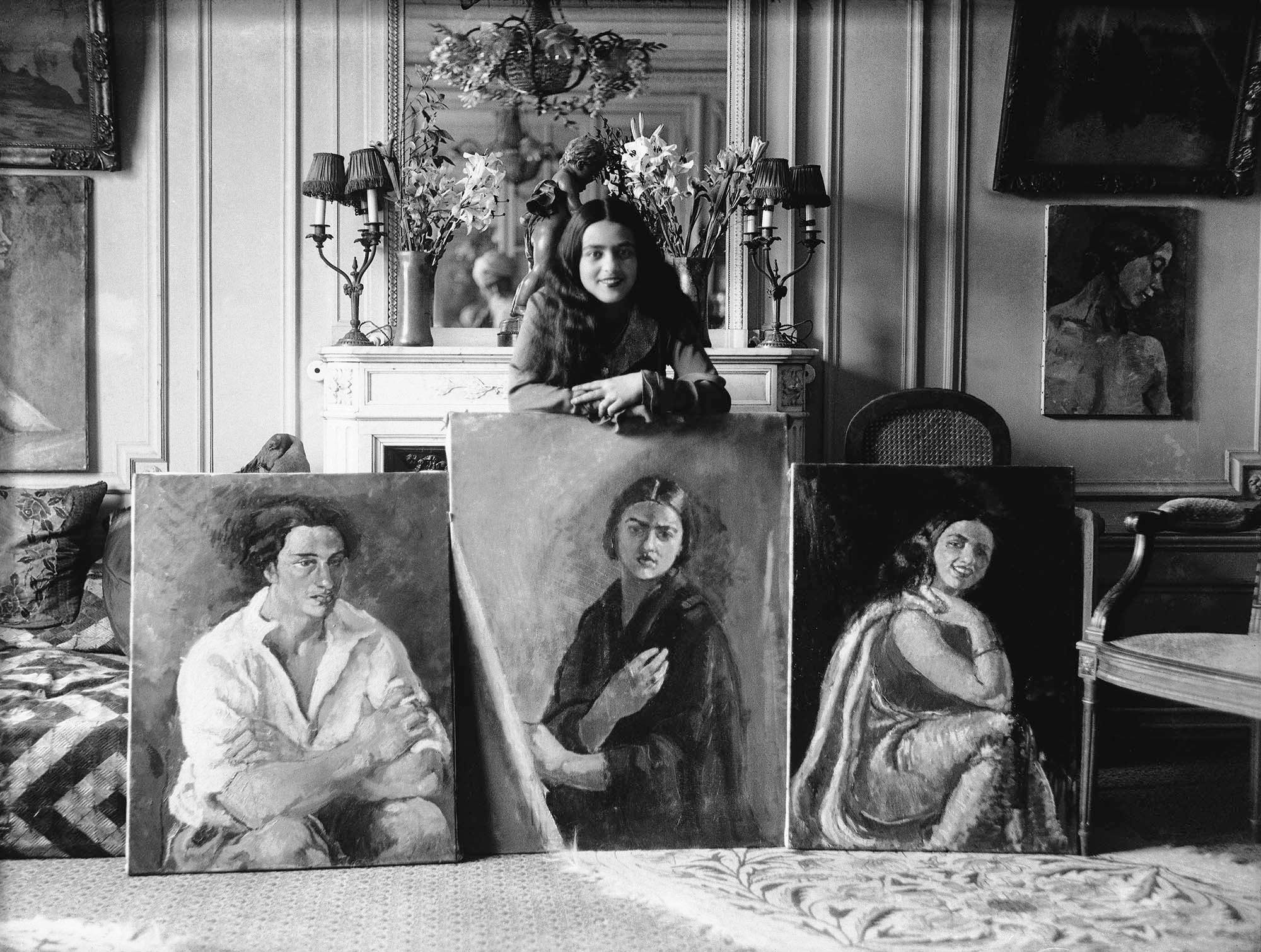
Amrita Sher-Gil (Paris) with her 1930 paintings (left to right: Boris Taslitzky, Self-Portrait with Easel, Self-Portrait 6)

In her early years, Sher-Gil was a frequent visitor to Zebegény, in Hungary. There she painted a church in 1932, and would several years later paint other views of the village including Winter and the Merry Cemetery. The early 1930s were also the years she worked at the École des Beaux-Arts, Paris, painted mostly family and colleagues, and won awards at the annual competitions for portrait and still life for three years in a row. In the summer of 1932, she submitted six paintings to the "end of year concours", Paris, for which she received second mention in her capacity as foreigner. The six included Violins, Nude Self-Portrait with Palette, and Young Girls. In her words, "my work in those days was absolutely Western in conception and execution except for the fact that it was never entirely tame or conventional".

== 1933-1934 ==
Sher-Gil later wrote that "towards the end of 1933 I began to be haunted by an intense longing to return to India, feeling in some strange inexplicable way that there lay my destiny as a painter". She subsequently painted Self-Portrait as a Tahitian in early 1934, while still in Paris. (Note: In Self-Portrait as a Tahitian " her tanned naked body is slightly turned, a possible reference to the artist's longing to return to India".)

== Late 1934-1935 ==
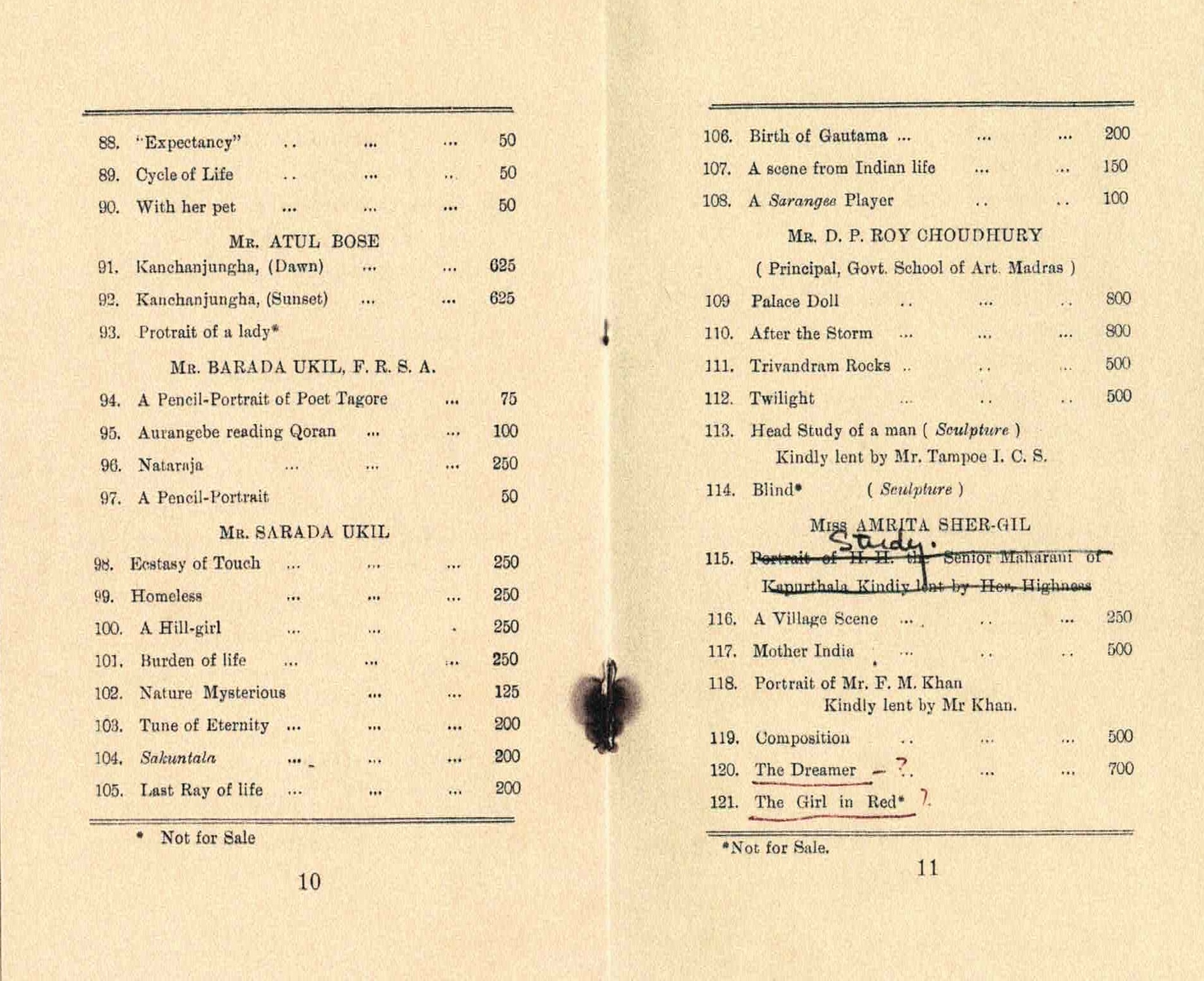
Catalogue content Cecil Hotel (September 1936)

Sher-Gil returned to India in late 1934, with 60 of her oil paintings. Then, she produced View from Majithia House, The Little Girl in Blue and Three Girls. In September 1935, five of her 10 submitted paintings were shown at the 63rd annual Simla Fine Arts Exhibition, opened by Viceroy Lord Willingdon. Those exhibited included Portrait of Father, Mother India, then known as Beggar Woman, Woman with Sunflower, then called Indian Peasant Woman, and Young Girls, then titled Conversation. The Man in White, The Woman in Blue, The Model, Portrait of Malcolm Muggeridge, and a small landscape were rejected. Feeling that they did not recognise the best of her work, she declined the Raja of Faridkot's prize the judges awarded her for Young Girls.

== 1936 ==
In March 1936, Sher-Gil won awards for two self-portraits at the fifth annual exhibition of the All-India Fine Arts Society, held at The Imperial, New Delhi. Barada Ukil included 11 of Sher-Gil's works in his arts exhibition at The Cecil, Simla, held in September 1936. These included Portrait of Mr. F. M. Khan, A Village Scene, Mother India, Composition, The Dreamer, and The Girl in Red. In December 1936, Sher-Gil's work was displayed at the exhibition hall in the Public Gardens, Hyderabad. There, the wealthy art collector, Nawab Salar Jung, showed interest in two paintings, was offered three, then declined to purchase any.

== 1937 ==
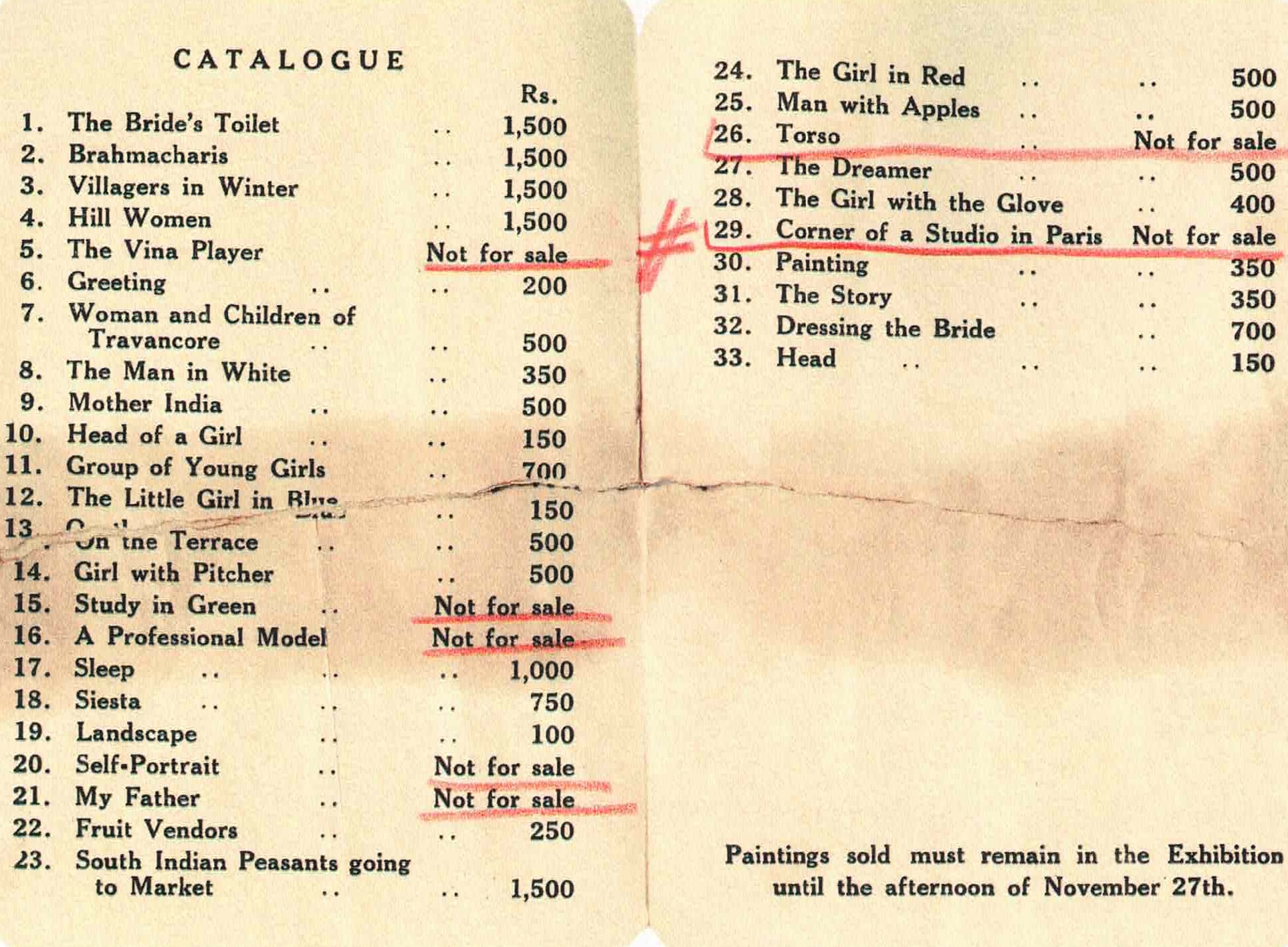
1937 Catalogue contents

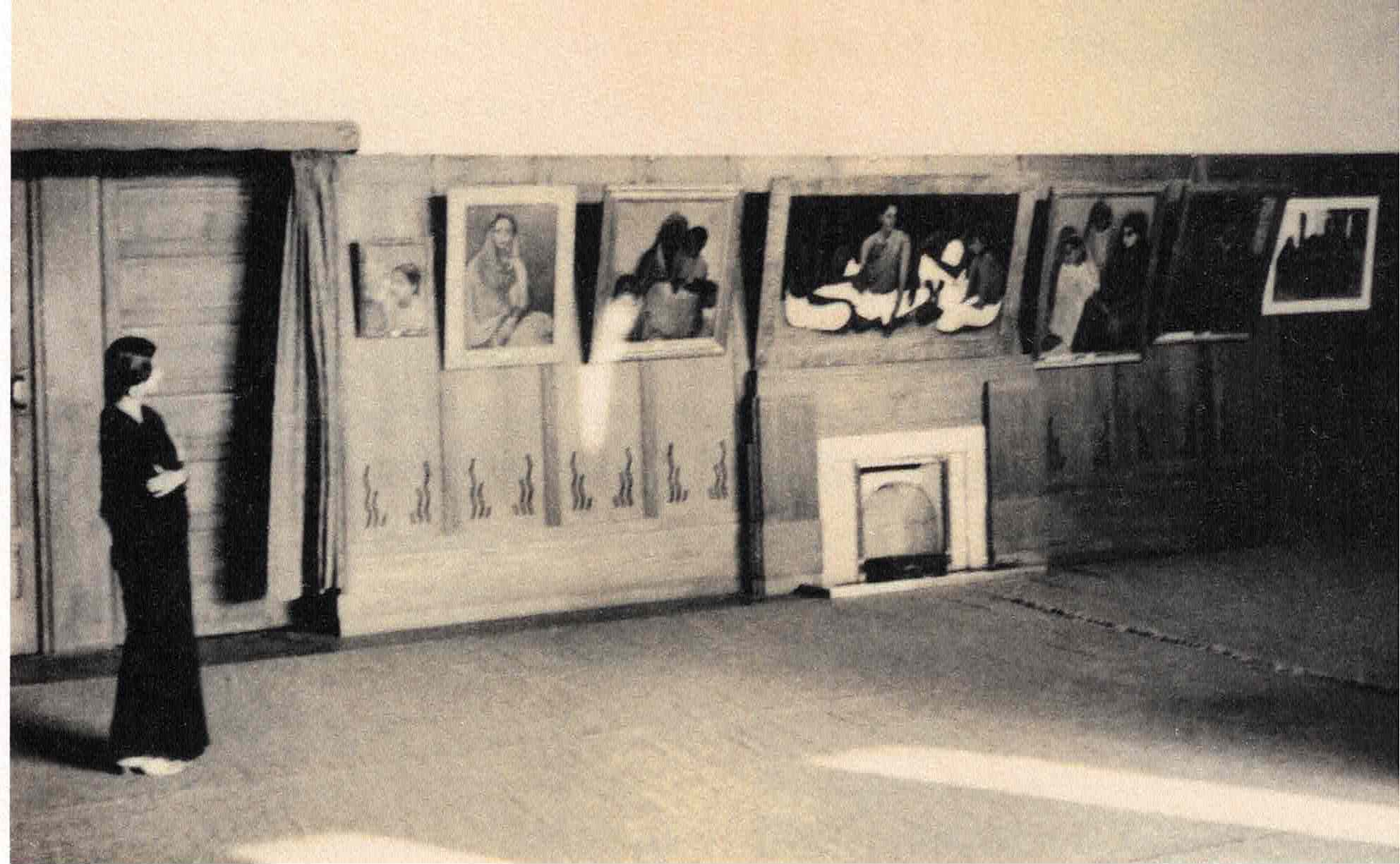
Solo exhibition, Lahore, November 1937

In October 1937, Sher-Gil painted her plein-air series, which included her first paintings with animals, one of which was The Story. From 21 to 27 November that year, 33 of her works were displayed at her solo exhibition at Faletti's Hotel in Lahore, British India. There, she revealed her first two Indian compositions, The Story and Siesta. At Lahore, four paintings were sold in total; The Little Girl in Blue, The Story, Pink Self-portrait, and the Vina Player. She wrote that "with the eternal significance of form and colour I interpret India and, principally, the life of the Indian poor on the plane that transcends the plane of mere sentimental interest".

== 1938-1939 ==
In 1938 five of Sher-Gil's paintings were exhibited at the All India Fine Arts and Crafts Society's exhibition in Delhi, and included Elephants Bathing in a Green Pool (1938), Composition (1936), and View from Studio (1934), which won the prize. In the same year she married Viktor Egan in Hungary, and there painted Two Girls among others. Returning to India in 1939, she moved to Saraya, Uttar Pradesh, and there her creations included Woman on Charpoy, Elephant Promenade, The Ancient Story Teller, and Haldi Grinders. The dome of the family's estate features in the background of some of these, though she omits the Saraya Sugar Mills and its chimneys and smoke.

== 1940s ==
In 1940, six of Sher-Gil's works were displayed at the Indian Academy of Fine Arts' Amritsar Exhibition (31 October – 10 November), to raise money for the War Fund. These included Siesta, Sleep, Elephant Promenade, Elephants, The Swing, and the winning piece, The Ancient Story Teller. Sher-Gil died at midnight on 5 December 1941, leaving The Last Unfinished Painting at Lahore.

== Legacy ==
By 1948, the Indian government had acquired 98 of Sher-Gil's paintings. Following her father's death, several paintings of hers were saved by Hungarian-Indian social worker Fori Nehru. The art restorer, Rupika Chawla, found several of Sher-Gil's paintings to have been altered by Sher-Gil herself. These include Siesta, Woman Holding Fan, and Hillside. In 1979 her works including Camels and Ancient Story Teller, were displayed at an exhibition in New delhi, organised by the Budapest Kunsthalle.

Under India's Antiquities and Art Treasures Act (1972), formed in accordance with the UNESCO 1970 Convention to regulate the internal and external dealing in antiquities in India, the Archaeological Survey of India in 1976 and 1979, named Sher-Gil's works as Indian treasure that if sold in India, cannot leave the country. Of the at least 143 listed paintings created by Sher-Gil, most are held by her relatives, and 44 of the 45 paintings that belonged to Viktor Egan and some paintings that were with her father, were donated to the National Gallery of Modern Art, New Delhi.

== Paintings (1930) ==
Table featuring paintings by Amrita Sher-Gil
Image	Title	Collection	Dimensions Technique	Notes Ref.
	1930: Seated Nude in Profile	Whereabouts unknown		Painted in Paris.
	1930: Young Girl in Profile	Whereabouts unknown		Painted in Paris.
	1930: Male Torso	New Delhi, National Gallery of Modern Art	62 × 94 cm Oil on canvas	Her only male nude, originally titled Back Study
	1930: Sitting Nude	New Delhi, National Gallery of Modern Art	66 × 91.5 cm Oil on canvas	Painted in Paris.
	1930: Old Man with Beard	Whereabouts unknown		Painted at La Baule, France
	1930: Brown Girl	Whereabouts unknown.		Painted in Paris.
	1930: Self-Portrait 6	New Delhi, National Gallery of Modern Art	58 × 79 cm Oil on canvas	Painted in Paris.
	1930: Amrita Sher-Gil Self-Portrait 7	New Delhi, National Gallery of Modern Art	47.4 × 70.2 cm Oil on canvas	Painted in Paris Depicts Sher-Gil with a shoulderless dress and loose hair.
	1930: Self-Portrait 8	New Delhi, National Gallery of Modern Art	53 × 82.5 cm Oil on canvas	Painted in Paris.
	1930: Self-Portrait 9	New Delhi, National Gallery of Modern Art	49 × 65.5 cm Oil on canvas	Painted in Paris.
	1930: Portrait of Mother	Private collection.	49 × 65 cm Oil on canvas	Completed in Paris.
	1930: Portrait of My Sister	Private collection	55.8 × 78.7 cm Oil on canvas	Painted in Paris.
	1930: Self-Portrait with Easel	Private Collection	82.5× 90.5 cm Oil on canvas	Painted in Paris, it depicts a three-quarter Sher-Gil draped in red, in front of an easel.
	1930: Self-Portrait with Red Background	Private collection	57 × 90 cm Oil on canvas	Painted in Paris.
	1930: Portrait	New Delhi, National Gallery of Modern Art	61.5 × 74.3 cm Oil on canvas	One of the earliest portraits Sher-Gil completed of Boris Taslitzky in Paris. It won a prize in 1931, at the École des Beaux-Arts, Paris. Also known as Portrait of a Young Man.
	1930: Boris Taslitzky			One of several portraits Sher-Gil completed of Boris Taslitzky in Paris.
	1930: Madam Taslitsky	New Delhi, National Gallery of Modern Art	54 × 79 cm Oil on canvas	Portrait of Boris's mother, painted in Paris. Mme Taslitsky later died in a concentration camp.

== Paintings (1931) ==
Table featuring paintings by Amrita Sher-Gil
Image	Title	Collection	Dimensions Technique	Notes Ref.
	1931: Self-Portrait 1	New Delhi, National Gallery of Modern Art	48 × 58.5 cm Oil on canvas	Painted in Paris.
	1931: Self-Portrait 2	New Delhi, National Gallery of Modern Art	44.5 × 59.5 cm Oil on canvas	Painted in Paris.
	1931: Self-Portrait 3	New Delhi, National Gallery of Modern Art	47.6 × 62.3 cm Oil on canvas	Painted in Paris.
	1931: Self-Portrait 4	New Delhi, National Gallery of Modern Art	48 × 63.5 cm Oil on canvas	Painted in Paris.
	1931: Self-Portrait with Red Flower	Evelyn Taslitzky's collection, Paris.	42 × 56 cm Oil on canvas	Painted in Paris.
	1931: Woman's Back			Exhibited at the Salon of the Société Nationale des Beaux-Arts, Paris, 1932. Later known as Torso.
	1931: Yusuf Ali Khan	New Delhi, National Gallery of Modern Art	45 × 53 cm Oil on canvas	At the encouragement of her mother, Sher-Gil was briefly engaged to aristocrat Yusuf Ali Khan, and painted his portrait in Paris.
	1931: Amrita Sher-Gil Self-Portrait	Private collection.	65.1 × 54 cm Oil on canvas	Completed in Paris. In 2015 it was sold for £1.7 million at auction in London. (Note: Not mentioned in Sundaram's book)
	1931: Victor Egan			Painted in Hungary. Egan refers to this portrait as "a stupid picture of me".
	1931: Alfred Cortot	New Delhi, National Gallery of Modern Art	44 × 30 cm Pastel on paper	Depicts Alfred Cortot
	1931: Portrait of a Young Woman	New Delhi, National Gallery of Modern Art	32 × 42.5 cm Oil on canvas	Painted in Paris.
	1931: Violins	New Delhi, National Gallery of Modern Art	59 × 82 cm Oil on canvas	Painted in Paris. One of six paintings submitted to the "end of year concours" in summer 1932.
	1931: Woman in Blue Coat	Private collection	48 × 66 cm Oil on canvas	Painted in Paris.
	1931: Girl in Mauve	New Delhi, National Gallery of Modern Art	36 × 53.7 cm Oil on canvas	Painted in Paris. Also known as Girl in Mauve 2.
	1931: Village Scene in Hungary	Private collection.	42 × 63 cm Oil on canvas	Painted in Hungary.
	1931: Dressing Table	New Delhi, National Gallery of Modern Art	75.5 × 62 cm Oil on canvas	Painted in Paris.

== Paintings (1932) ==
Table featuring paintings by Amrita Sher-Gil
Image	Title	Collection	Dimensions Technique	Notes Ref.
	Portrait of a Parisian Lady			
	1932: Torso	New Delhi, National Gallery of Modern Art	62 × 83 cm Oil on canvas	Painted in Paris.
	1932: Self-Portrait 5	New Delhi, National Gallery of Modern Art	43 × 54.5 cm Oil on canvas	Painted in Paris.
	1932: Adam and Eve	New Delhi, National Gallery of Modern Art	38.7 × 52.1 cm Oil on canvas	
	1932: Still Life with Green Bottles and Apples	Private collection	37 × 54.5 cm Oil on canvas	Painted in Paris.
	1932: Nude Self-Portrait with Palette	Whereabouts unknown		Possibly "my nude" that Sher-Gil submitted to the "end of year concours" in summer 1932.
	1932: Self-Portrait in Green Dress	Private collection	51 × 60.5 cm Oil on canvas	Completed in Paris.
	1932: Self-Portrait in Green	Private collection	64.8 × 90 cm Oil on canvas	Completed in Paris around June 1932, and described by Sher-Gil as "a very good self-portrait".
	1932: Department Store	New Delhi, National Gallery of Modern Art	49.5 × 62 cm Oil on canvas	Likely the store called Printemps that she took a sketch of in June 1932.
	1932: The Blue Danube	Whereabouts unknown		Painted in Hungary.
	1932: Hungarian Gypsy Girl	New Delhi, National Gallery of Modern Art	81.3 × 52.7 cm Oil on canvas	One of two paintings of the same girl who posed for Sher-Gil in old clothes, completed in the summer of 1932 in Zebegény. Ella Szepessy, Sher-Gil's maternal aunt, lived in a villa on the Zebegény hillside.
	1932: Gypsy Girl from Zebegény	Private collection	41 × 62 cm Oil on canvas	One of two paintings of the same girl who posed for Sher-Gil in old clothes, completed in the summer of 1932 in Zebegény. In green and red, it depicts a gypsy girl holding a basket of fruit.
	1932: Girls in conversation	Private collection	82 × 53 cm Oil on canvas	On 2 August 1932, after completing the Gypsy Girls, Sher-Gil began a large painting of two poor girls in Zebegény.
	1932: Two Children on a Hillside			Sher-Gil wrote to her parents in the summer of 1934 requesting they sell "the two little girls I painted in Zebegény, which I hate". A smaller version: In January 1937, she mentions selling a "picture of the two children on a hillside I had painted in Zebegény", at the Hyderabad exhibition for ₹250 in December 1936. She called it the "small rotten painting", mostly kept rolled up.
	1932: Klarra Szepessy	New Delhi, National Gallery of Modern Art	53.5 × 99.5 cm Oil on canvas	Portrait of Sher-Gil's mother's younger sister.
	1932: Hungarian Village Church	Private collection.	54.5 × 81.2 cm Oil on canvas	Painted in Zebegény, Hungary.
	1932: Denise Prouteaux	New Delhi, National Gallery of Modern Art	57 × 81 cm Oil on canvas	Painted in Paris.
	1932: Portrait of Denise Prouteaux	Private collection		
	1932: Young Man with Apples	New Delhi, National Gallery of Modern Art	71 × 97 cm Oil on canvas	One of several portraits Sher-Gil completed of Boris Taslitzky, this was exhibited at the XII Salon des Tuileries in 1934. Number 25 of 33 of Sher-Gil's works displayed at her solo exhibition at Faletti's Hotel in Lahore, British India, held from 21 to 27 November 1937. There, it was priced at ₹500.
	1932: Notre Dame	New Delhi, National Gallery of Modern Art	59.5 × 81 cm Oil on canvas	This was being created in June 1932, in Paris.
	1932: Young Girls	New Delhi, National Gallery of Modern Art	133 × 164 cm Oil on canvas	Painted in June 1932. One of six paintings submitted to the "end of year concours" in summer 1932. Earned Sher-Gil the appointment of associate member of the 1933 Paris Salon.
	1932: Marie-Louise Chassanay	New Delhi, National Gallery of Modern Art	66.5 × 94.5 cm Oil on canvas	
	1932: Sitting Nude	New Delhi, National Gallery of Modern Art	54 × 75 cm Oil on canvas	
	1932: Potted Plant in Blossom	New Delhi, National Gallery of Modern Art	46 × 54 cm Oil on canvas	Painted in Paris.
	1932: My Grandmother	New Delhi, National Gallery of Modern Art	46 × 63.5 cm Oil on canvas	Portrait of Antonia Grottesmann née Martonfalvy (1864–1937), painted in Hungary.
	1932: Viola Egan	Private collection		Painted in Hungary
	1932: Gypsy Woman wearing Shawl	Private collection of Istvan Szekely.	33 × 42 cm Oil on canvas	Painted in Hungary.
	Boat			

== Paintings (1933) ==
Table featuring paintings by Amrita Sher-Gil
Image	Title	Collection	Dimensions Technique	Notes Ref.
	1933: Self-Portrait with a Smile	Private collection	45.8 × 33.2 cm Oil on canvas	Painted in Hungary. (Note: Sundaram notes this to have been completed in 1932, though Sotheby's point out that Sher-gil signed it dated 1933.)
	1933: Reclining Nude	New Delhi, National Gallery of Modern Art	70.7 × 93.5 cm Oil on canvas	Completed in Budapest, it depicts Sher-Gil's cousin Viola, sister of her husband Victor Egan.
	1933: Open Air Painters	New Delhi, National Gallery of Modern Art	53 × 84 cm Oil on canvas	Completed in Paris.
	1933: The Girl in Black	Whereabouts unknown		Painted in Paris. Exhibited at the Salon of the Societe Nationale in 1934. This was cut out of a large unfinished painting depicting Sher-Gil, Indira, Denise Prouteaux, and a nude model, and gifted to Denise. According to Prouteaux, she left the painting in a warehouse in Grenoble, shortly after the German occupation of Paris. When she returned after the war, it was missing. It had been taken by a German officer to Germany.
	1933: Spanish Girl	New Delhi, National Gallery of Modern Art	59 × 91.5 cm Oil on canvas	Completed in Paris.
	1933: Sleep	New Delhi, National Gallery of Modern Art	112.5 × 79.1 cm Oil on canvas	Painted in Paris 1932–1933, it depicts Sher-Gil's sister Indira. Displayed at the 1937 exhibition in Lahore for a price of ₹1,000, but did not sell. It was later left with the Indian National Congressman and her friend Diwan Chaman Lall "to see if he could palm it off on someone but he wasn't successful".
	1933: Professional Model	New Delhi, National Gallery of Modern Art	72× 100 cm Oil on canvas	Created in 1933 in Paris and depicts a nude consumptive. Its vernissage took place in February 1933. Displayed at the 1937 exhibition in Lahore.

== Paintings (1934) ==
Table featuring paintings by Amrita Sher-Gil
Image	Title	Collection	Dimensions Technique	Notes Ref.
	1934: Model in Green			Created in 1934 in Paris and modelled on the same nude as in Professional Model.
	1934: Self-portrait with long hair	Private collection	35.5× 45.7 cm Oil on canvas	Painted in Paris
	1934: Model in Brown			Created in 1934 in Paris and modelled on the same nude as in Professional Model.
	1934: View from Studio	Private collection	42 × 45.6 cm Oil on canvas	Probably completed from her studio at the corner of the Rue de la Grande-Chaumière, in the Rue Notre-Dame-des-Champs. In 1938, at the All India Fine Arts and Crafts Society's exhibition in Delhi, it was awarded best picture in oils and gold medal for best picture by a female artist. In Sher-Gil's opinion it was the "weakest" of the five paintings she submitted.
	1934: Self-Portrait as a Tahitian	Delhi, Kiran Nadar Museum of Art	90 × 56 cm Oil on canvas	
	Boat			Landscape, painted in the summer of 1934, Veroce, Hungary, where her maternal aunt Blanca lived.
	Vine			Landscape, painted in Veroce.
	1934: The Little Girl in Blue	India, private collection	48 × 40.6 cm Oil on canvas	One of Sher-Gil's earliest paintings upon returning to India in 1934. It depicts a young Babette Mann. Displayed at the 1937 exhibition in Lahore, with a sale price of ₹150, and bought by Charles Fabri. Sold by auction in 2018 for ₹18.69 crore, equivalent to $2.67 million.
	1934: View from Majithia House	Payal and Rajiv Chaudhri, New York	33× 23 cm Oil on canvas	Painted in December 1934

== Paintings (1935) ==
Table featuring paintings by Amrita Sher-Gil
Image	Title	Collection	Dimensions Technique	Notes Ref.
	1935: Group of Young Girls	New Delhi, National Gallery of Modern Art	92.8 × 66.5 cm Oil on canvas	Completed on 1 January 1935. Sher-Gil wrote to her mother on 1 January 1935 "Today I finished the painting of Mahindra's three daughters. It is excellent". Also called Group of Young Girls, it was displayed at the 1937 exhibition in Lahore for a price of ₹700.
	1935: Woman on Terrace	Private collection	73.6 × 99 cm Oil on canvas	Painted in February 1935 at Majithia House, Amritsar, and modelled on Mohindra's maid, Guro. Displayed at the 1937 exhibition in Lahore for a price of ₹500.
	1935: Beggars	Private collection	59 × 84 cm Oil on canvas	Painted in early 1935 at Simla.
	1935: Woman with Sunflower			Formerly called Indian Peasant Woman.
	1935: Woman with Fan	New Delhi, National Gallery of Modern Art	59 × 82.5 cm Oil on canvas	Painted in July 1935 at Mashobra, Simla, modelled on Prakash, Umrao Singh's daughter by his first marriage. Sher-Gil possibly later made alterations to the face.
	1935: Boys with Lemons	Private collection	56 × 90 cm Oil on canvas	Painted at Simla.
	1935: Mother India	New Delhi, National Gallery of Modern Art	62 × 78 cm Oil on canvas	Painted in May/June 1935 at Simla. Formerly titled Beggar Woman. Displayed at both the 1936 exhibition at the Cecil, and the 1937 exhibition in Lahore for a price of ₹500. Possibly reminiscent of the poor man in Picasso's Blue Period.
	1935: Portrait of Malcolm Muggeridge	Sikander Rahim (son of Esther Rahim), Pakistan		Sher-Gil met Muggeridge in May 1935 and last saw him in September that year. Painted at Simla in June 1935.
	1935: Malcolm Muggeridge	New Delhi, National Gallery of Modern Art	59.5 × 94 cm Oil on canvas	Painted at Simla in June 1935. His hand is larger than his face.
	1935: Portrait of Father		60 × 91.5 cm Oil on canvas	Painted in May/June 1935 at Simla. Displayed at the 1937 exhibition in Lahore for a price of ₹500.
	1935: Man in White			Painted at Simla and modelled on student philosopher from Delhi, Prem Chand (1911–1995). Displayed at the 1937 exhibition in Lahore for a price of ₹350. There, she was offered ₹250 for it.
	Portrait of Mr. F. M. Khan	Hamid Haroon, Pakistan		In green, blue and grey, he is posed on a stool. Gifted to publisher of Dawn, Haroon in the 1990s by Khan's widow.
	1935: Nude Group	New Delhi, National Gallery of Modern Art	81.3 × 114.3 cm Oil on canvas	In the foreground is Sumair Kaur.
	1935: Two Women	New Delhi, National Gallery of Modern Art	74 × 100 cm Oil on canvas	Painted at Saraya.
	1935: Two Women in White	Private collection.	35 × 24 cm Oil on canvas	Painted at Simla.
	1935: Hill Men		89× 148.5 cm Oil on canvas	Painted in 1935 at Simla. (Note: Sundaram lists Hill Men as completed in December 1935, and Hill Women the previous month. Others state that Hill Men was created first.)
	1935: Hill Women	Private collection of Vivan Sundaram and Navina Sundaram, Delhi	89 × 147.3 cm Oil on canvas	Painted in 1935 after Hill Men, at Simla. Depicts three young women and a girl. Exhibited at the Paris Salon in 1936 and then at Hyderabad for a price of ₹2,500, where it was admired by Sarojini Naidu, who tried to persuade the Museum of Hyderabad to acquire the painting. Displayed at the 1937 exhibition in Lahore for a price of ₹1,500.

== Paintings (1936) ==
Table featuring paintings by Amrita Sher-Gil
Image	Title	Collection	Dimensions Technique	Notes Ref.
	1936: Raja Surat Singh	Private collection	48.5 × 74 cm Oil on canvas	Painted in February 1936 at Saraya.
	1936: The Little Untouchable	Whereabouts unknown		Painted in March 1936 at Saraya.
	1936: Portrait of Girl with Flower	Private collection	30 × 40 cm Oil on canvas	Painted in March 1936 at Saraya.
	1936: Child Wife	Private collection	53 × 76 cm Oil on canvas	Painted in March 1936 at Saraya. Also known as Child Bride. Was planned to be shown at the Lahore exhibition in November 1937, but Sher-Gil changed her mind.
	1936: Sunder Singh	Private collection	50.8 × 64.7 cm Oil on canvas	Painted in March 1936 at Saraya
	1936: Portrait of Joji	Private collection	64.7 × 92.7 cm Oil on canvas	Painted in March 1936 at Saraya Depicts Joji, Jagjeevan/Gurjeevan (1913–2005), daughter of Kirpal Singh Majithia, and sister of Dalip Singh Majithia. Sher-Gil wrote to her mother on 10 February 1936 that "I shall grudgingly paint her to her advantage so that she likes her image, and maybe she will purchase my painting".
	1936: Sumair	New Delhi, National Gallery of Modern Art	54 × 89 cm Oil on canvas	Portrait of Sumair Kaur, daughter of Umrao Singh's first son, Balram. Painted at Saraya. (Note: Sumair (born 1918), became a model in Paris and was later associated with the underworld, Nazis and Axis agents. Bernard Wasserstein describes her as having "a podgy face and snub nose, and was somewhat short for a model".)
	1936: Portrait of Sister	Private	62 × 92.7 cm Oil on canvas	Painted at Simla.
	1936: Woman in Red	Seeta Badrinath, Chennai	53 × 89 cm Oil on canvas	Painted at Simla.
	1936: Composition	Private collection	68.5 × 91.4 cm Oil on canvas	Considered by herself as one of her best at the time. It was titled "Water Carriers" when exhibited at the Salon. Depicts a water jar in front of a child and a coolie. Painted in Simla and sold in November 1936 at Sher-Gil's exhibition at the Taj Mahal Palace Hotel Mumbai for ₹1,000 to Anand Prabha Shankar Pattani, son of Prabhashankar Pattani. It was one of five of her paintings exhibited at the All India Fine Arts and Crafts Society's exhibition in Delhi in 1938.

== Paintings (1937) ==
Table featuring paintings by Amrita Sher-Gil
Image	Title	Collection	Dimensions Technique	Notes Ref.
	1937: Fruit Vendors	New Delhi, National Gallery of Modern Art	73.6 × 105.5 cm Oil on canvas	Painted in January 1937 at Cape Comorin, Tamil Nadu. Displayed at the 1937 exhibition in Lahore for a price of ₹250.
	1937: The Vina Player	Lahore Museum, Lahore, Pakistan		Displayed at the Lahore exhibition (1937), where it was bought for the museum.
	1937: Raja of Kollengode	Siddarth John, Thiruvananthapuram.	77.5× 116 cm Oil on canvas	Painted at Simla in March 1937, a "portrait to order", her mother described it as "an ancient pope propped up in his chair to receive the final unction".
	1937: Girl with Pitcher	Whereabouts unknown	68 × 105.4 cm Oil on canvas	Completed in Simla in April 1937, she told Karl that this painting was a success for her: "two dark figures, burnt sienna against a luminous white background".
	1937: Bride's Toilet	New Delhi, National Gallery of Modern Art	144.5 × 86 cm Oil on canvas	Completed in April 1937. One of Sher-Gil's South Indian trilogy. Displayed at the Lahore exhibition (1937) for a price of ₹1,500.
	1937: Brahmacharis	New Delhi, National Gallery of Modern Art	144.5 × 86.5 cm Oil on canvas	Painted in May 1937 at Simla. One of Sher-Gil's South Indian trilogy. Displayed at the Lahore exhibition (1937) for a price of ₹1,500.
	1937: Village Girl	New Delhi, National Gallery of Modern Art	56 × 90 cm Oil on canvas	
	1937: Namaskar	New Delhi, National Gallery of Modern Art	38 × 48.7 cm Oil on canvas	Painted at Simla.
	1937: South Indian Villagers going to Market		90 × 147.3 cm Oil on canvas	Painted at Sher-Gil's home, The Holme, Simla, around October 1937, along with the two smaller compositions The Story Teller and Siesta. Displayed at the 1937 exhibition in Lahore for a price of ₹1,500. In 1940, the painting was one of six of Sher-Gil's works displayed at the Indian Academy of Fine Arts' Amritsar Exhibition (31 October – 10 November), to raise money for the War Fund.
	1937: Self-Portrait	Private collection	52 × 78 cm Oil on canvas	Completed in October 1937 at Simla. Possibly the painting Sher-Gil calls Pink Self-portrait, sold at the Lahore exhibition in November 1937.
	1937: Siesta	New Delhi, National Gallery of Modern Art	83 × 55 cm Oil on canvas	Painted in October 1937 at Simla. According to Vivan Sundaram it was originally titled Fantasy, and completed at Simla. Displayed at the 1937 exhibition in Lahore for a price of ₹750. Sher-Gil in a letter to Khandelwal dated 19 December 1937, wrote "my fantasy (which I have called Painting)", and was priced at ₹350 at Lahore. Sher-Gil possibly later made alterations to the painting. In 1940, the painting was one of six of Sher-Gil's works displayed at the Indian Academy of Fine Arts' Amritsar Exhibition (31 October – 10 November), to raise money for the War Fund.
	1937: Dressing the Bride	Private collection	70 × 95 cm Oil on canvas	Painted at Simla in November 1937.
	1937: Women on the Beach	Government Museum and Art Gallery, Chandigarh	29.9 × 40 cm Oil on canvas	Painted at Cape Comorin. Modelled on South Indian women.
	1937: Villagers in Winter		Oil on canvas	One of Sher-Gil's South Indian trilogy. Displayed at the Lahore exhibition (1937) for a price of ₹1,500.
	1937: Mendicant	New Delhi, National Gallery of Modern Art	36 × 52 cm Oil on canvas	Painted at Simla
	1937: Two Mendicants	New Delhi, National Gallery of Modern Art	66.5 × 89.5 cm Oil on canvas	Painted at Simla
	1937: Lady Daljit Singh of Kapurthala	New Delhi, National Gallery of Modern Art	55 × 89 cm Oil on canvas	Portrait of Rani Lady Daljit Singh of Kapurthala.
	1937: Self-Portrait	Private collection.	52× 78 cm Oil on canvas	One of two self-portraits completed in Simla, Sher-Gil described this as "sugary".
	1937: Self-Portrait in Blue Sari	Private collection	45× 79 cm Oil on canvas	One of two self-portraits completed in Simla.
	1937: Head of Girl	Private collection	29 × 33 cm Oil on canvas	Painted at Simla.
	1937: Bullock Cart	Private collection	41 × 30 cm Oil on canvas	Painted at Simla.
	1937: The Story Teller	India, private collection	59 × 79 cm Oil on canvas	Sher-Gil's first painting with animals, she described it as "a little composition with cows", and Karl noticed its Pahari characters. Bought by Badruddin Tyabji jr at the 1937 exhibition in Lahore, where it was put up for ₹250. Sold at auction in 2023 for ₹61.8 crore ($2.67 million).

== Paintings (1938) ==
Table featuring paintings by Amrita Sher-Gil
Image	Title	Collection	Dimensions Technique	Notes Ref.
	1938: Portrait of a Stout Lady	Whereabouts unknown.		One of two commissioned paintings, Sher-Gil called "nerve-wracking". Begun in Lahore in December 1937, and completed in January 1938. Sher-Gil described it as "a stout lady who squints outward and wants to be depicted slender and charming. How I hate it". Left unsigned.
	Portrait of Mrs Hirlalal			Though Sher-Gil typically charged ₹500 for each portrait of a head, two portraits were requested for Mrs Hirlalal, and she asked for ₹700 to do both.
	1938: Portrait of Shakuntala Kapur	National Art Gallery, Pakistan (Note: Sundaram states this painting's whereabouts is unknown.)		One of two commissioned paintings, Sher-Gil called "nerve-wracking", completed in early 1938 in Lahore, it depicts Shakuntala Lall, who asked Sher-Gil to adjust her "ugly" fingers to appear slender. Sher-Gil did as requested and left the painting unsigned. In the 1950s it was found in a rag shop in Lahore and acquired for free by Ashfaq Ahmed. Ahmed was charged ₹3 for the frame and offered the picture for nothing. He walked away with the painting, leaving the frame behind. At the request of artist Zubeida Agha, he gave it to the National Art Gallery, Islamabad.
	1938: Portrait of Helen	Whereabouts unknown	26.5 × 35 cm Oil on canvas	In January 1938 from Faletti's, Sher-Gil painted Helen Chaman Lall, and wrote to her parents "I have started on a head of Mrs. Chaman Lall for which I don't wish to charge them anything".
	1938: Red Brick House	Private	37 × 26.6 cm Oil on canvas	Completed in Lahore in January 1938. Depicts a bakery called Thompson's and was given to N. Iqbal Singh. In July 2006, it was sold at Osian's for ₹ 1.3 crore.
	1938: Elephants Bathing in a Green Pool		81 × 56 cm Oil on canvas	Completed in Saraya in February 1938. It was one of five of her paintings exhibited at the All India Fine Arts and Crafts Society's exhibition in Delhi in 1938.
	1938: Village Group	Private collection	95 × 66 cm Oil on canvas	Painted in March 1938 at Saraya.
	1938: Women in Red	New Delhi, National Gallery of Modern Art	59.5 × 53.7 cm Oil on canvas	Painted in March 1938 at Saraya.
	1938: Three Bullock Carts	Private collection	78.7 × 40.6 cm Oil on canvas	Completed in Saraya in March 1938.
	1938: Hill Scene	New Delhi, National Gallery of Modern Art	65 × 87.5 cm Oil on canvas	Completed in Simla in April 1938.
	1938: Hill Side	New Delhi, National Gallery of Modern Art	65 × 87.5 cm Oil on canvas	Completed in Simla in June 1938.
	1938: Village Scene	Indian businessman, Nand Khemka, private collection	84 × 62 cm Oil on canvas	Painted around February–March 1938, in Simla. Sold at Osian's in March 2006 to Khemka for $1.6 million.
	1938: In the Ladies Enclosure	Private collection	81 × 56 cm Oil on canvas	Painted in March 1938 at the family estate in Saraya, Gorakhpur. Depicts a group of women, including members of the Majithia family, and a dog. Sold at auction in 2021 for ₹ 37.8 crore.
	1938: Red Clay Elephant	Vivan and Navina Sundaram collection, New Delhi.	66 × 96.5 cm Oil on canvas	Completed in March 1938 at Saraya. Formerly known as Ganesh Puja.
	1938: Red Verandah	New Delhi, National Gallery of Modern Art	71.6 × 144.2 cm Oil on canvas	Painted in May 1939 in Simla.
	1938: Sardarni Kirpal Singh Majithia	Private collection	66 × 92.7 cm Oil on canvas	Painted in April 1938 in Saraya, Sher-Gil wrote to her mother in March 1938..."Kirpal has asked me to paint his wife from memory and the aid of a rotten photograph". (Note: Kirpal Singh (1891–1944) was Sher-Gil's cousin, married to Raminder Kaur (1894–1936), also known as Sardarni Kirpal Singh Majithia)
	1938: Potato Peeler	New Delhi, National Gallery of Modern Art	59.5 × 72.7 cm Oil on canvas	Completed in November 1938 in Hungary.
	1938: In the Garden	75 × 60 cm Oil on canvas	Private collection	Painted in Hungary and gifted to Viola Egan.
	1938: Hungarian Church Steeple	Private collection	45.7 × 67.3 cm Oil on canvas	Painted in Kiskunhalas, Hungary, in November 1938, a few months after she returned there to marry Viktor Egan.
	1938: Hungarian Village Market	New Delhi, National Gallery of Modern Art	72 × 97 cm Oil on canvas	Painted in Kiskunhalas, Hungary, in November 1938. Best known artwork of hers from this trip to Hungary. Depicts the white tower of Kiskunhalas church behind people dressed in black
	1938: Trees	Zsuzsa Urbach, Budapest.	38.2 × 61 cm Oil on canvas	
	1938: Hungarian Peasant	New Delhi, National Gallery of Modern Art	38 × 53 cm Oil on canvas	Painted in Kiskunhalas in November 1938.

== Paintings (1939) ==
Table featuring paintings by Amrita Sher-Gil
Image	Title	Collection	Dimensions Technique	Notes Ref.
	1939: Winter	New Delhi, National Gallery of Modern Art	73.6 × 52 cm Oil on canvas	Painted in Zebegény in January 1939
	1939: Merry Cemetery	New Delhi, National Gallery of Modern Art	73 × 98.5 cm Oil on canvas	Painted in Zebegény.
	1939: Portrait of Victor Egan	Private collection of Manoj Israni (2022)	63.5× 80 cm Oil on canvas	Painted in Hungary. Portrays Egan in army uniform, and sold in 2020 to Manoj Israni for ₹10.86 crore.
	1939: Female Torso	New Delhi, National Gallery of Modern Art	56 × 99 cm Oil on canvas	Painted in Budapest.
	1939: Two Girls	Vivan & Navina Sundaram	89 × 129 cm Oil on canvas	Painted in Budapest in March 1939, the dark girl is modelled on a dark Hungarian gypsy. The effect of the painting is considered by some as the pinnacle of Sher-Gil's repeating theme of equality between a dark and fair woman, an idea that began in her 1932 painting Young Girls.
	1940: Resting	New Delhi, National Gallery of Modern Art	99 × 110.7 cm Oil on canvas	Painted in November 1939 at Simla.

== Paintings (1940) ==
Table featuring paintings by Amrita Sher-Gil
Image	Title	Collection	Dimensions Technique	Notes Ref.
	1940: Ancient Story Teller	New Delhi, National Gallery of Modern Art	70 × 87 cm Oil on canvas	Painted at Saraya in January 1940. The painting was one of six of Sher-Gil's works displayed at the Indian Academy of Fine Arts' Amritsar Exhibition (31 October – 10 November), to raise money for the War Fund. There, it was awarded the Sardar S. G. Thakur Singh Award (₹50) for best composition in oil. Displayed by the Budapest Kunsthalle at New Delhi, in 1979.
	1940: The swing	New Delhi, National Gallery of Modern Art	70 × 91.4 cm Oil on canvas	Completed in March 1940, the painting was one of six of Sher-Gil's works displayed at the Indian Academy of Fine Arts' Amritsar Exhibition (31 October – 10 November), to raise money for the War Fund. The main figure is modelled on (Tejwant Kaur (Teji), daughter of Kirpal Singh Majithia, Sher-Gil's cousin.
	1940: Woman on Charpoy	New Delhi, National Gallery of Modern Art	85 × 72.4 cm Oil on canvas	Completed at Saraya in June 1940. The main figure is modelled on Teji.
	1940: Bride	New Delhi, National Gallery of Modern Art	70 × 98 cm Oil on canvas	Painted at Saraya
	1940: Resting Mother	New Delhi, National Gallery of Modern Art	97 × 72 cm Oil on canvas	Painted at Saraya.
	1940: Elephant Promenade	New Delhi, National Gallery of Modern Art	92.5 × 126.5 cm Oil on canvas	In 1940, the painting was one of six of Sher-Gil's works displayed at the Indian Academy of Fine Arts' Amritsar Exhibition (31 October – 10 November), to raise money for the War Fund.
	1940: Elephants	New Delhi, National Gallery of Modern Art	72 × 86.3 cm Oil on canvas	Painted in March 1940 in Saraya. In 1940, the painting was one of six of Sher-Gil's works displayed at the Indian Academy of Fine Arts' Amritsar Exhibition (31 October – 10 November), to raise money for the War Fund.
	1940: Two Elephants	New Delhi, National Gallery of Modern Art	43.2 × 52 cm Oil on canvas	Painted at Saraya.
	1940: Haldi Grinders	New Delhi, National Gallery of Modern Art	74.7 × 100 cm Oil on canvas	Painted at Saraya.
	1940: Musicians	New Delhi, National Gallery of Modern Art	67.5 × 93 cm Oil on canvas	Painted in December 1940. Depicts three Sants.
	1940: Horse and Groom	Unknown		Painted at Saraya.
	1940: Woman at Bath	New Delhi, National Gallery of Modern Art	70 × 92 cm Oil on canvas	Painted at Saraya.

== Paintings (1941) ==
Table featuring paintings by Amrita Sher-Gil
Image	Title	Collection	Dimensions Technique	Notes Ref.
	1941: Village Girls	New Delhi, National Gallery of Modern Art	44.3 × 52.2 cm Oil on canvas	Painted at Saraya in August 1941. From Sardarnagar, Gorakhpur, Sher-Gil wrote to Badruddin Tyabji on 3 September 1941 that she had completed the Village Girls after at least six months of not looking at her brushes. "The spell has suddenly broken now and I am working with passion". In Sher-Gil's words it depicts "four little girls weaving baskets. The background an acid lemon, the children a medley of hot colour."
	1941: Camels	New Delhi, National Gallery of Modern Art	74.7 × 100 cm Oil on canvas	Painted at Saraya in September 1941. Sher-Gil wrote to her mother on 29 August 1941 that "I am doing a lot of drawings of animals. Camels, horses, baffaloes etc.". In Sher-Gil's words it depicts "a curious rose coloured Indian saddle on one of the animals". Displayed by the Budapest Kunsthalle at New Delhi, in 1979.
	1941: The Last Unfinished Painting	New Delhi, National Gallery of Modern Art	65.7× 87.5 cm Oil on canvas	Was being painted in early December 1941 at Lahore. Sher-Gil's intention was to paint what she could see from her terrace: the milkmen's buffaloes that lived near her home.

== See also ==
- List of National Treasures of India

== Bibliography ==
- Dalmia, Yashodhara (2013). Amrita Sher-Gil: A Life. Gurugram: Penguin Books. ISBN 978-0-14-342026-2.
- Sundaram, Vivan (2010). Amrita Sher-Gil: A Self-Portrait in Letters and Writings. Vol. 1. New Delhi: Tulika Books. pp. 1–417. ISBN 978-81-89487-59-1.
- Sundaram, Vivan (2010). Amrita Sher-Gil: A Self-Portrait in Letters and Writings. Vol. 2. New Delhi: Tulika Books. pp. 418–821. ISBN 978-81-89487-59-1.
