= Statler =

Statler may refer to:

== Characters ==
- Statler (Muppet), a Muppet character

== Music ==
- The Statler Brothers, a country music group

== Places ==
- Statler Hotels, a defunct chain of luxury hotels
- Statler Hills
- Statler Arms Apartments, high-rise in Cleveland
- Statler Fountain, a 1930 fountain installed in Boston's Statler Park

== Surname ==
- Alfred Statler (1916–1984), American painter and magazine photographer
- Ellsworth Milton Statler (1863–1928), founder of Statler Hotels

== See also ==
- Hotel Statler (disambiguation)
- Statler chicken
