= Village Scene =

1938 painting by Amrita Sher-Gil

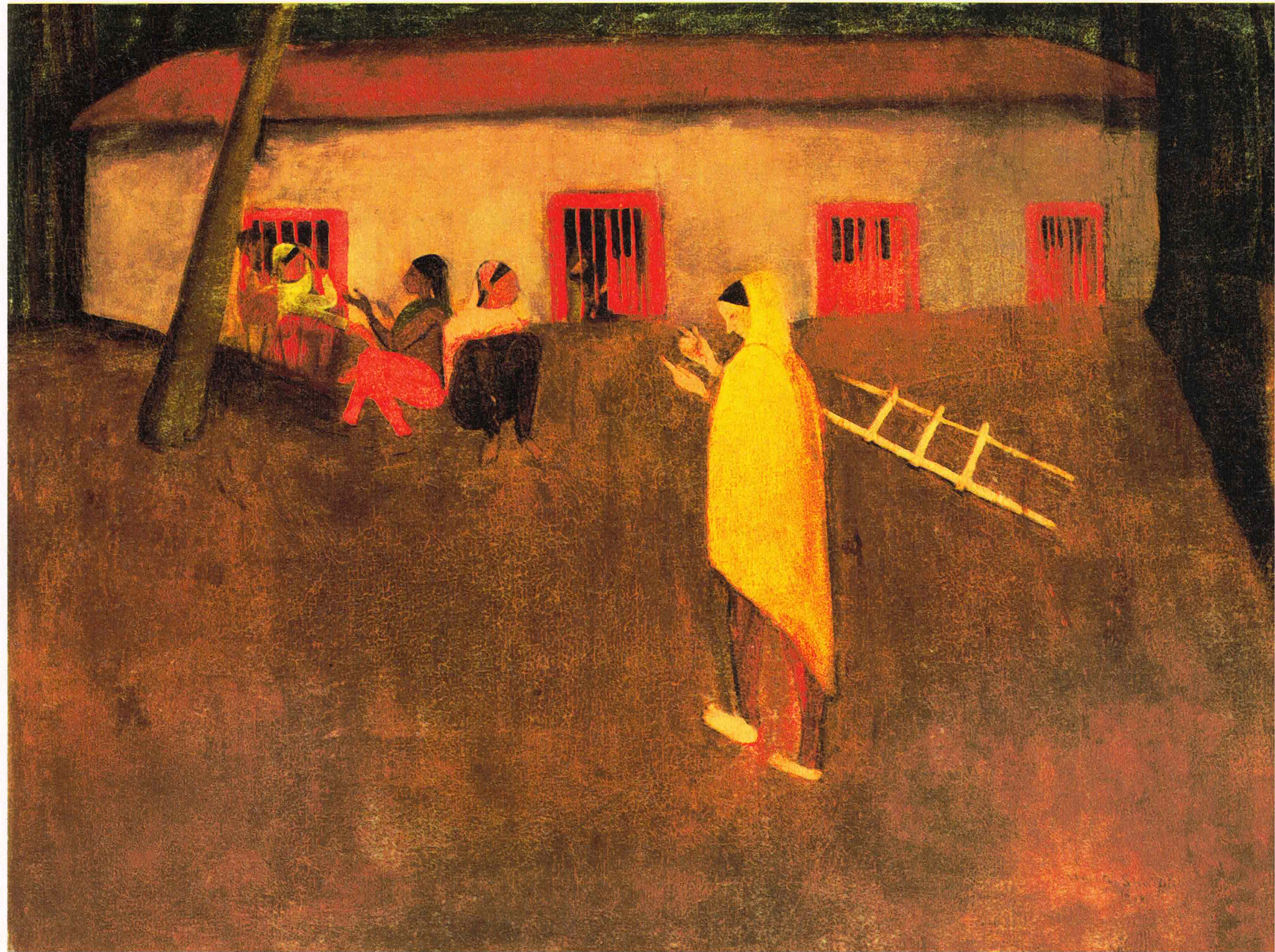
- Village Scene
- Artist: Amrita Sher-Gil
- Completion date: 1938
- Dimensions: 62 cm × 84 cm (24 in × 33 in)
- Designation: Private collection

Village Scene is an oil on canvas painting depicting Indian village life, completed in 1938 at Simla, India, by Hungarian-Indian artist Amrita Sher-Gil (1913 – 1941). (Note: An earlier painting titled A Village Scene was shown at Barada Ukil's exhibition at The Cecil, Simla, held in September 1936.) In March 2006 it was sold for $1.6 million.

== See also ==
- List of paintings by Amrita Sher-Gil

== Bibliography ==
- Dalmia, Yashodhara (2013). Amrita Sher-Gil: A Life. Gurugram: Penguin Books. ISBN 978-0-14-342026-2.
- Sundaram, Vivan (2010). Amrita Sher-Gil: A Self-Portrait in Letters and Writings. Vol. 1. New Delhi: Tulika Books. pp. 1–417. ISBN 978-81-89487-59-1.
- Sundaram, Vivan (2010). Amrita Sher-Gil: A Self-Portrait in Letters and Writings. Vol. 2. New Delhi: Tulika Books. pp. 418–821. ISBN 978-81-89487-59-1.
