= Child Wife =

1936 painting by Amrita Sher-Gil

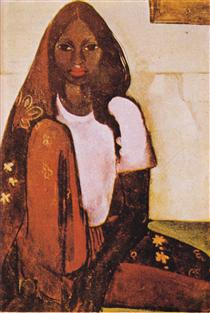
- Artist: Amrita Sher-Gil
- Year: 1936
- Medium: Oil on canvas
- Dimensions: 76 cm × 53 cm (30 in × 21 in)
- Location: Saraya private collection

Child Wife, also known as Child Bride (1936), is an oil on canvas painting by Hungarian-Indian artist Amrita Sher-Gil (1913 – 1941). It measures 53 × 76 cm, and belongs to the Saraya private collection.

== Composition ==
Child Wife is an oil on canvas painting depicting a young Indian girl sitting alone dressed in her bridal outfit. It measures 53 × 76 cm, and belongs to the Saraya private collection.

== Background ==
Amrita Sher-Gil (1913 – 1941), was a Hungarian-Indian artist. At the age of 12 years, in India, she witnessed a girl of age 13 years being married to a 50 year old man. She completed Child Wife in 1936, the year after painting Mother India. From her home in Simla, in a letter to her friend Denise Prouteaux dated July 1937, Sher-Gil told her that the painting is "too influenced by Gauguin. I am now getting away from his influence".

== Interpretation ==
Art historian Sonal Khullar interprets the Child Wife and Mother India as neither depicting rosy images of women, but they have a connection with Indian nationalist aspirations for reform in India. She says that Sher-Gil's paintings of 1935 to 1936 "refuse to represent India as voluptuous, colorful, sunny and superficial"... "their dark, detached, and distant subjects critique nationalism's idealization of the masses".

== See also ==
- List of paintings by Amrita Sher-Gil

== Bibliography ==
- Dalmia, Yashodhara (2013). Amrita Sher-Gil: A Life. Gurugram: Penguin Books. ISBN 978-0-14-342026-2.
- Sundaram, Vivan (2010). Amrita Sher-Gil: A Self-Portrait in Letters and Writings. Vol. 1. New Delhi: Tulika Books. pp. 1–417. ISBN 978-81-89487-59-1.
- Sundaram, Vivan (2010). Amrita Sher-Gil: A Self-Portrait in Letters and Writings. Vol. 2. New Delhi: Tulika Books. pp. 418–821. ISBN 978-81-89487-59-1.
