= Amrita Sher-Gil Self Portrait (1931) =

1931 painting by Amrita Sher-Gil

Amrita Sher-Gil self portrait
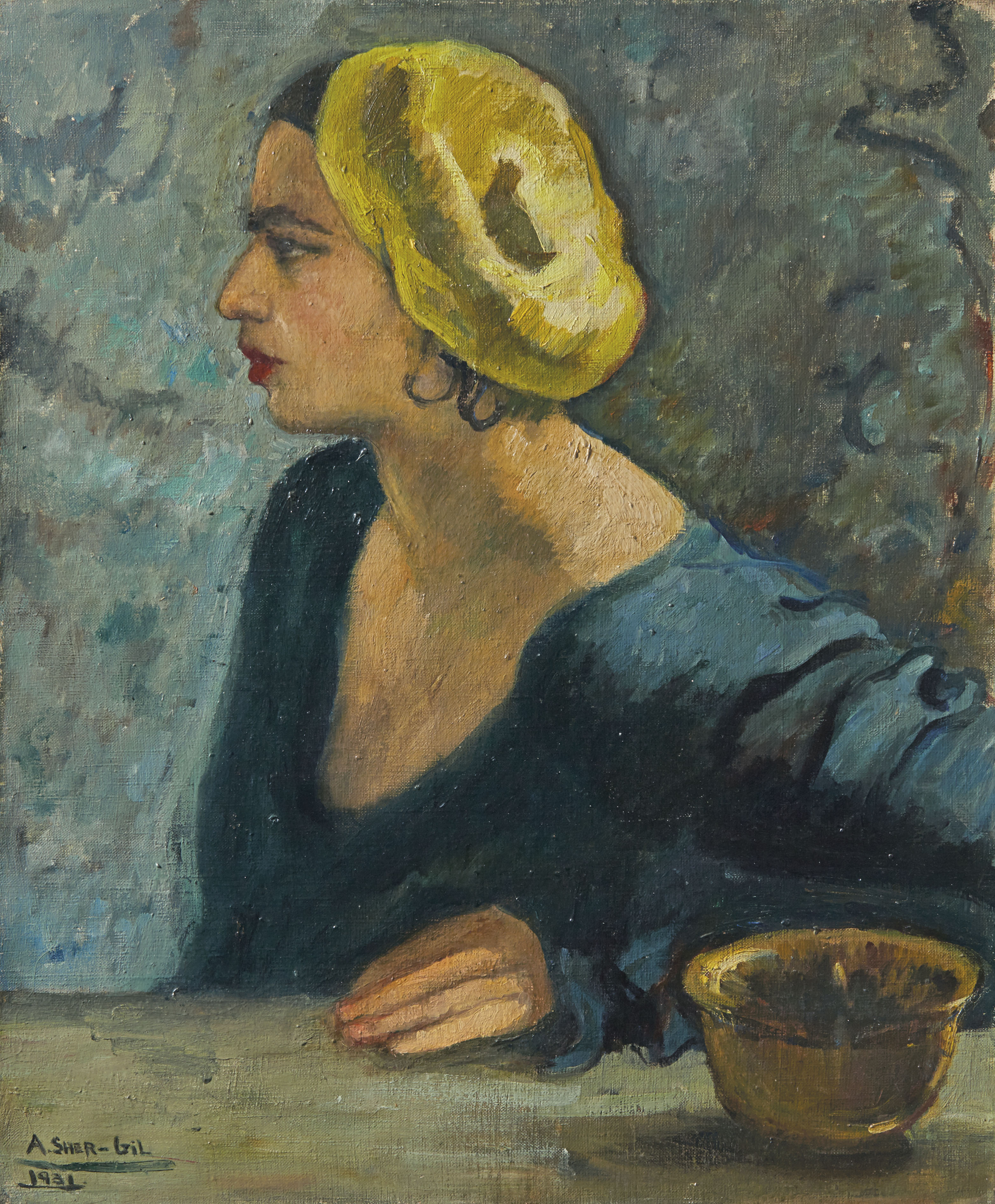
- Artist: Amrita Sher-Gil
- Year: 1931
- Medium: Oil on canvas
- Dimensions: 65.1 cm × 54 cm (25.6 in × 21 in)

The untitled self portrait by Hungarian-born Indian artist Amrita Sher-Gil (1913–1941), is an oil on canvas painting completed in 1931 in Paris, and gifted to her friend Boris Taslitzky. It was created in the same year that she produced portraits of Yusuf Ali Khan, who she was engaged to, and Viktor Egan, her cousin who she later married. In 2015 it was sold for £1.7 million at auction in London.

In Sher-Gil's lifetime, 19 were self-portraits painted in Europe between 1930 and 1934, and two, including one in a blue sari, were later completed in India.

== See also ==
- List of paintings by Amrita Sher-Gil

== Bibliography ==
- Dalmia, Yashodhara (2013). Amrita Sher-Gil: A Life. Gurugram: Penguin Books. ISBN 978-0-14-342026-2.
- Sundaram, Vivan (2010). Amrita Sher-Gil: A Self-Portrait in Letters and Writings. Vol. 1. New Delhi: Tulika Books. pp. 1–417. ISBN 978-81-89487-59-1.
- Sundaram, Vivan (2010). Amrita Sher-Gil: A Self-Portrait in Letters and Writings. Vol. 2. New Delhi: Tulika Books. pp. 418–821. ISBN 978-81-89487-59-1.
