= The Last Unfinished Painting =

1941 painting by Amrita Sher-Gil

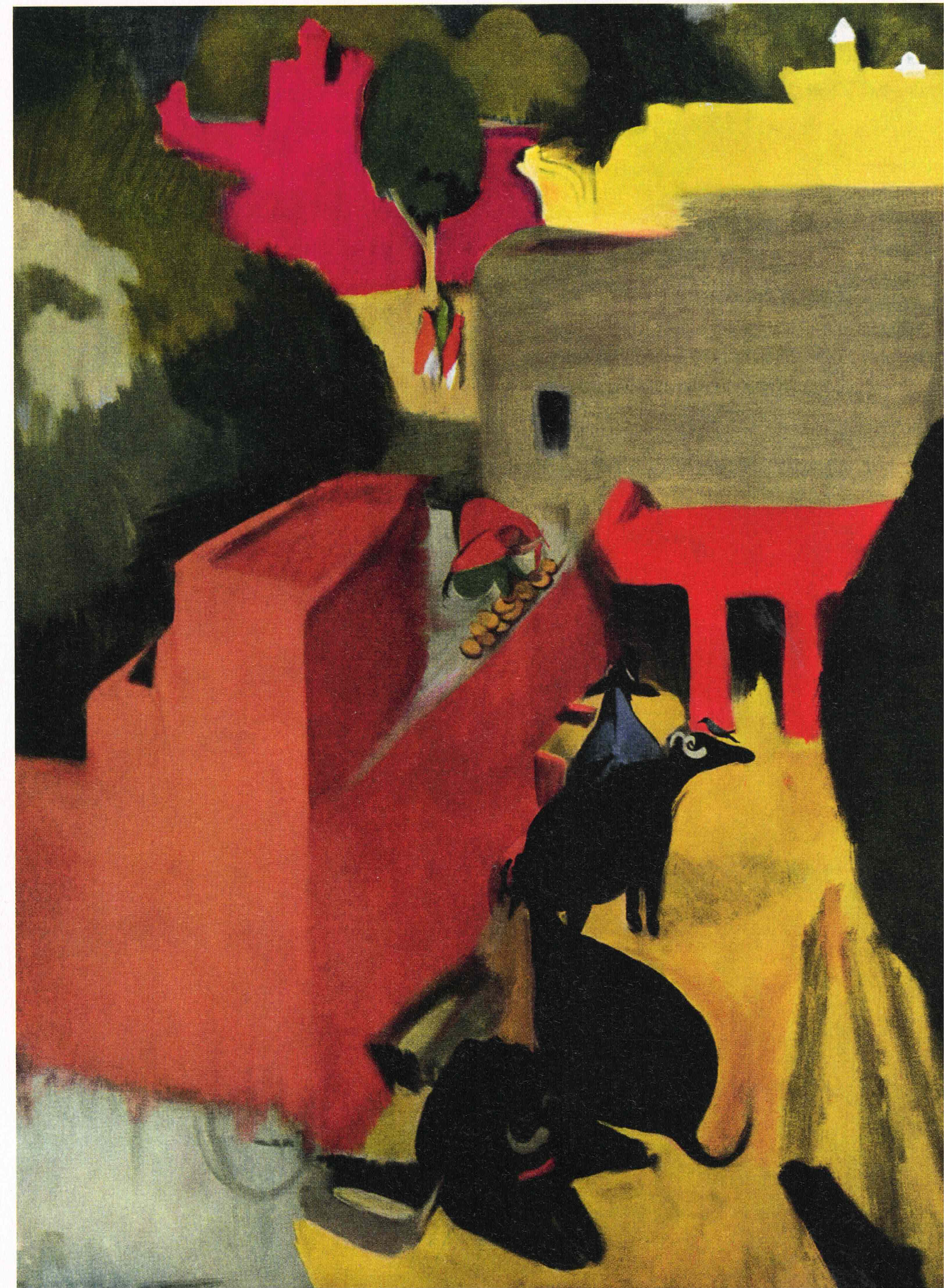
- The Last Unfinished Painting
- Artist: Amrita Sher-Gil
- Year: 1941
- Medium: Oil on canvas
- Dimensions: 65.7 cm × 87.5 cm (25.9 in × 34.4 in)
- Location: National Gallery of Modern Art, New Delhi

The Last Unfinished Painting, originally titled On the Roof, is Amrita Sher-Gil's last oil on canvas painting, created from the window of her apartment in Lahore, India, shortly before her death in December 1941. Her intention was to paint what she could see from her terrace: the milkmen's buffaloes that lived near her house. A detailed account of the painting is given in Vivan Sundaram's last unwritten letter, which he dated 1 December 1941. In it is described a mysterious black object that appears in the bottom right corner, though it was erased in a restoration after 1944.

== See also ==
- List of paintings by Amrita Sher-Gil

== Bibliography ==
- Dalmia, Yashodhara (2013). Amrita Sher-Gil: A Life. Gurugram: Penguin Books. ISBN 978-0-14-342026-2.
- Sundaram, Vivan (2010). Amrita Sher-Gil: A Self-Portrait in Letters and Writings. Vol. 1. New Delhi: Tulika Books. pp. 1–417. ISBN 978-81-89487-59-1.
- Sundaram, Vivan (2010). Amrita Sher-Gil: A Self-Portrait in Letters and Writings. Vol. 2. New Delhi: Tulika Books. pp. 418–821. ISBN 978-81-89487-59-1.
