= Amrita Sher-Gil Self-Portrait 7 (1930) =

1930 painting by Amrita Sher-Gil

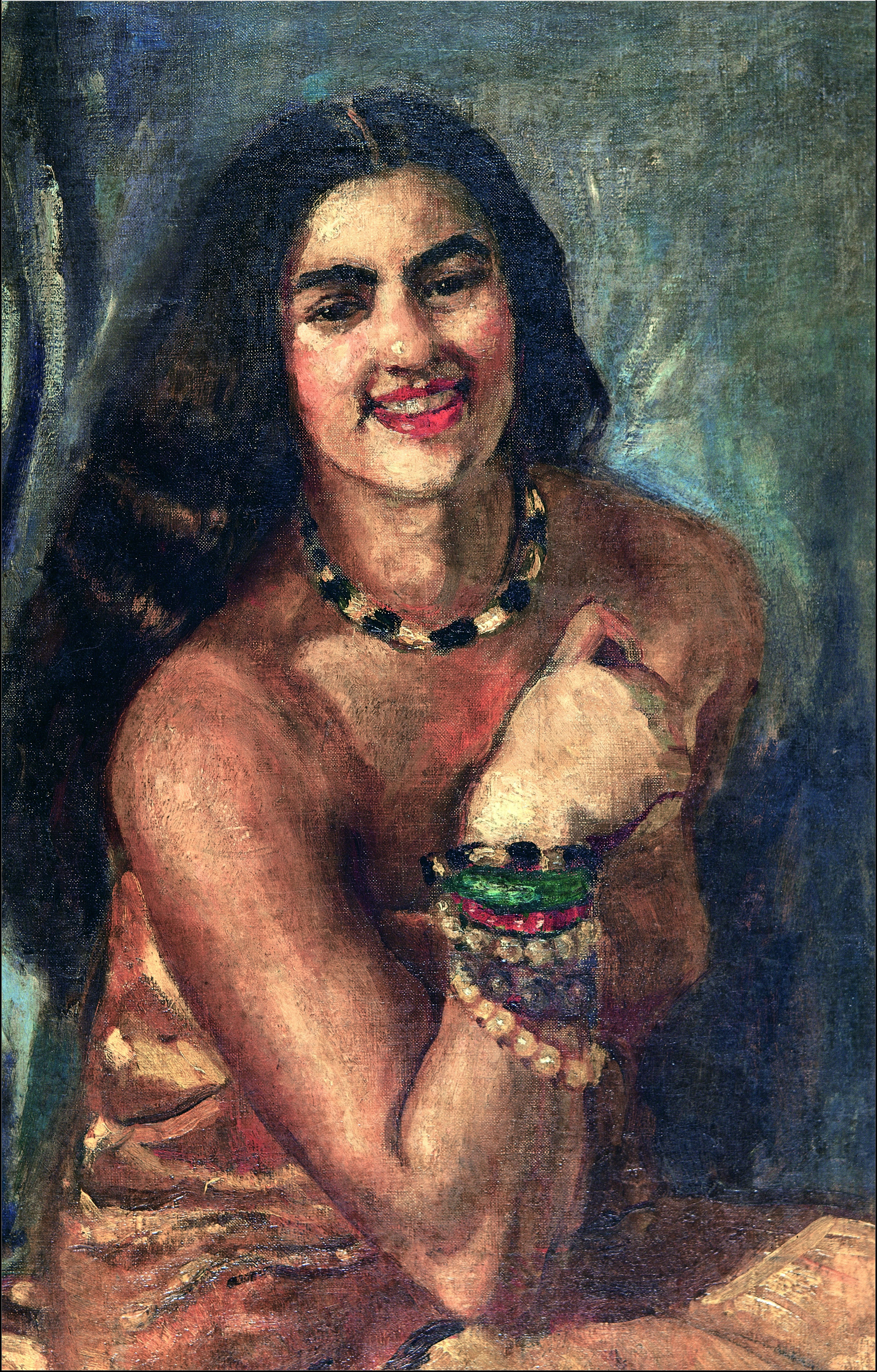

Self-Portrait 7 is a self-portrait by Hungarian-Indian artist Amrita Sher-Gil, one of several of her self-portraits completed in 1930 in Paris. It shows her as a "vivacious and jovial" character. In the portrait, Sher-Guil's hair falls freely and she is wearing a dress that reveals her shoulders. She appears leaning forward towards the viewer, and looks seductive. It has been likened to Renoir's portrait of the Actress Jeanne Samary (1877), and Raja Ravi Varma's late 19th century painting, Lady Holding a Fruit. It is one of her 19 known self-portraits created in Europe.

== Exhibition history ==
Self-Portrait 7 has been showcased in several significant exhibitions, including:

- Amrita Sher-Gil: The Passionate Quest at the National Gallery of Modern Art, New Delhi
- Amrita Sher-Gil Birth Centenary Celebrations at UNESCO, Paris
- Amrita Sher-Gil – An Artist Family in the 20th Century in Munich, Germany (2006–2007)
- Amrita Sher-Gil at Tate Modern, London (2007)

== See also ==
- List of paintings by Amrita Sher-Gil

== Bibliography ==
- Dalmia, Yashodhara (2013). Amrita Sher-Gil: A Life. Gurugram: Penguin Books. ISBN 978-0-14-342026-2.
- Sundaram, Vivan (2010). Amrita Sher-Gil: A Self-Portrait in Letters and Writings. Vol. 1. New Delhi: Tulika Books. pp. 1–417. ISBN 978-81-89487-59-1.
- Sundaram, Vivan (2010). Amrita Sher-Gil: A Self-Portrait in Letters and Writings. Vol. 2. New Delhi: Tulika Books. pp. 418–821. ISBN 978-81-89487-59-1.
