= Woman on Charpoy =

1940 painting by Amrita Sher-Gil

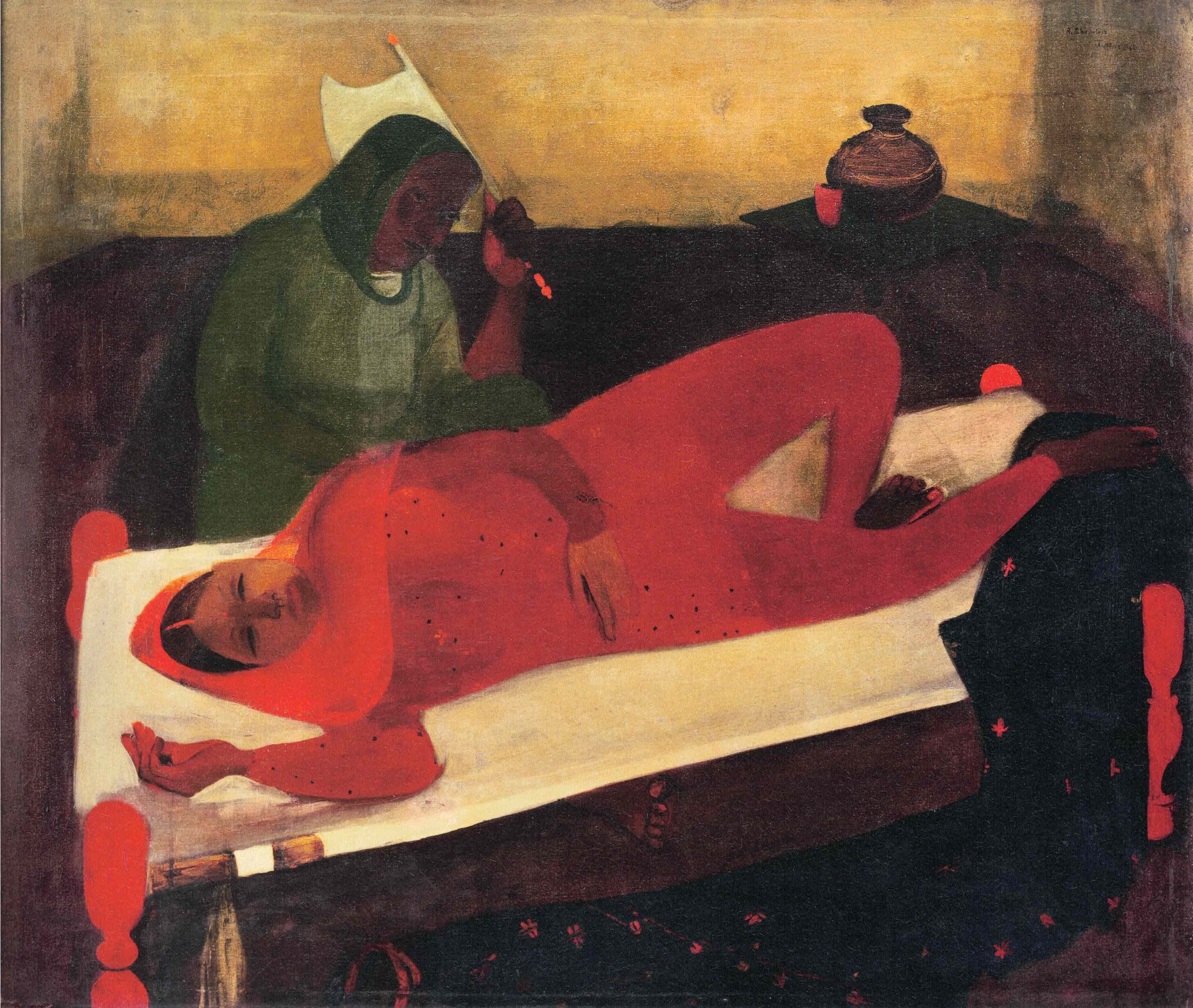
- Artist: Amrita Sher-Gil
- Completion date: 1940
- Dimensions: 85 cm × 72.4 cm (33 in × 28.5 in)

Woman on Charpoy is an oil on canvas painting depicting an Indian woman in red, lying on a charpoy with one leg bent. It was completed in 1940 by Hungarian-Indian artist Amrita Sher-Gil.

== Bibliography ==
- Dalmia, Yashodhara (2013). Amrita Sher-Gil: A Life. Gurugram: Penguin Books. ISBN 978-0-14-342026-2.
- Sundaram, Vivan (2010). Amrita Sher-Gil: A Self-Portrait in Letters and Writings. Vol. 1. New Delhi: Tulika Books. pp. 1–417. ISBN 978-81-89487-59-1.
- Sundaram, Vivan (2010). Amrita Sher-Gil: A Self-Portrait in Letters and Writings. Vol. 2. New Delhi: Tulika Books. pp. 418–821. ISBN 978-81-89487-59-1.
