= Statler Fountain =

Fountain and sculpture in Boston, Massachusetts, U.S.

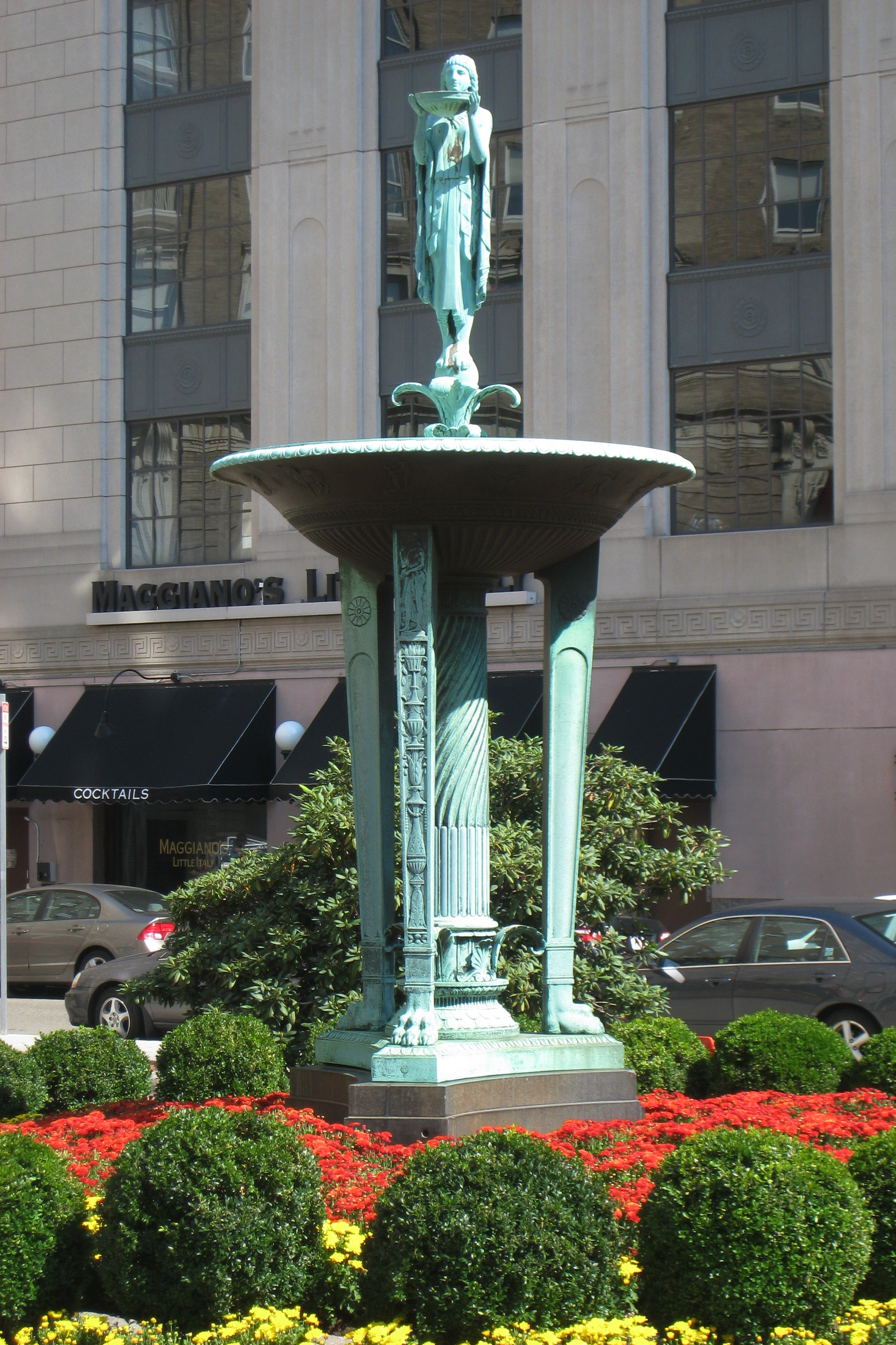
- The fountain in 2008
- Artist: Ulysses Anthony Ricci
- Medium: Bronze, granite, concrete
- Location: Boston, Massachusetts, U.S.
- 42°21′2.3″N 71°4′8.2″W

Statler Fountain is a 1930 fountain designed by Ulysses Anthony Ricci, installed in Boston's Statler Park, in the U.S. state of Massachusetts. The Art Deco fountain features a bronze statue of a woman. It was surveyed as part of the Smithsonian Institution's "Save Outdoor Sculpture!" program in 1993.

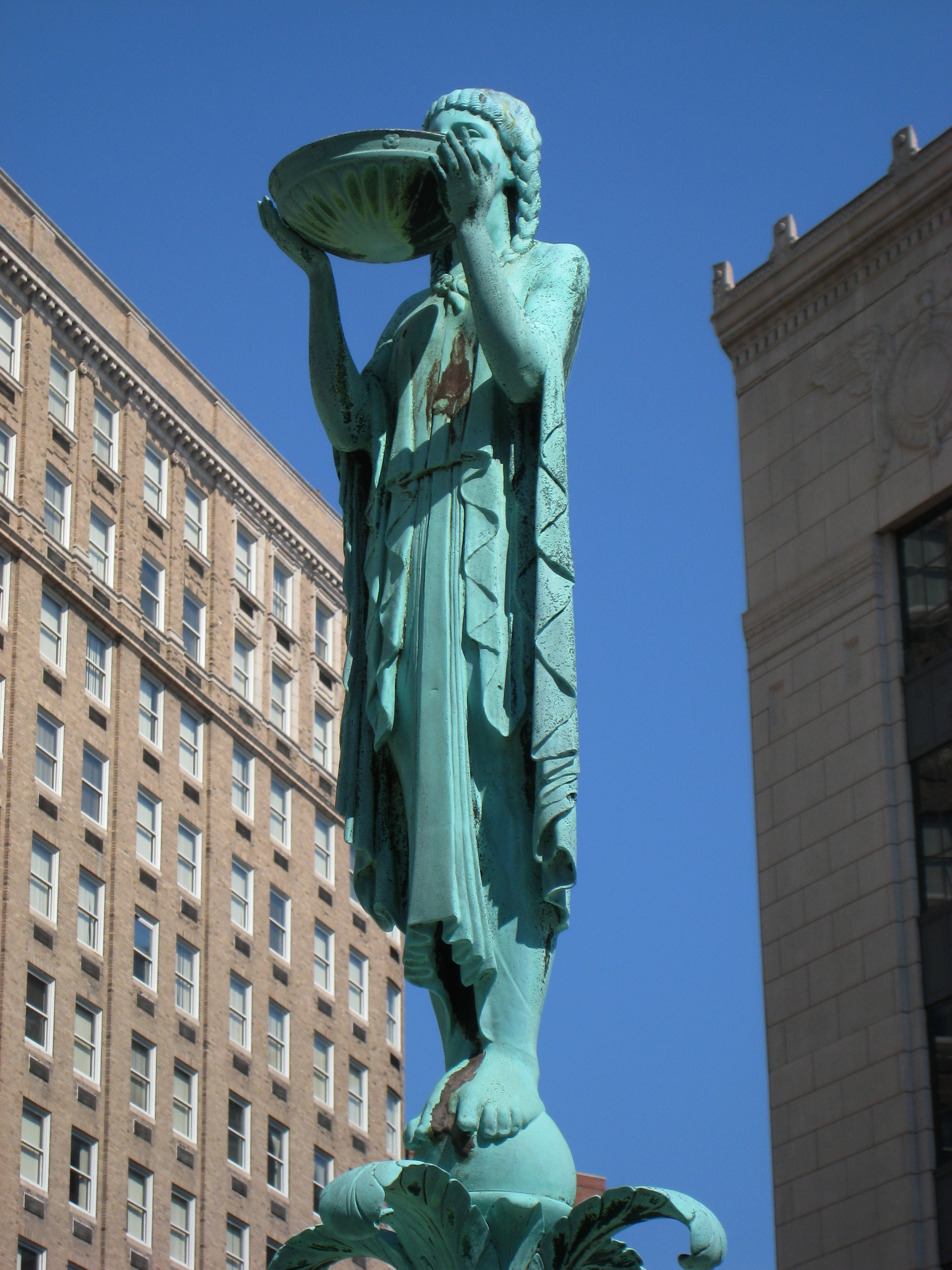
The statue, 2008

== See also ==
- 1930 in art
