= Amongst the Nerves of the World =

Painting by C.R.W. Nevinson

- Artist: C. R. W. Nevinson
- Year: 1930
- Type: Oil on canvas, cityscape painting
- Dimensions: 97.7 cm × 72.5 cm (38.5 in × 28.5 in)
- Location: Museum of London, London

Amongst the Nerves of the World is an oil painting on canvas by the British artist C.R.W. Nevinson, from 1930.

== History and description ==
A cityscape, it depicts a view of Fleet Street looking eastwards from an upper-storey window towards Ludgate Hill and St Paul's Cathedral. A steam train can be seen crossing the bridge heading to Holborn Viaduct station. Fleet Street was at the time the centre of British journalism. Nevinson was a leader of the British futurist movement around the time of the First World War. Although he later drifted away from the movement, this work reflects a return to the style. It shows a strong influence of Umberto Boccioni in using telephone and telegraph wires to criss-cross the painting, emphasising the dynamic nature of the location.

Today the painting is in the collection of the Museum of London, having been gifted to its predecessor in 1930.

== Bibliography ==
- Galinou, Mireille & Hayes, John. London in Paint: Oil Paintings in the Collection at the Museum of London. The Museum, 1996.
- Ingleby, Richard. C.R.W. Nevinson: The Twentieth Century. Merrell Holberton, 1999.
- Ross, Catherine. Twenties London: A City in the Jazz Age. Bloomsbury, 2003.
- Yass, Marion. Britain Between the World Wars, 1918-1939. Wayland, 1975.
