= Kurt Dornis =

German painter, graphic artist and draughtsman

Kurt Dornis (born 7 October 1930) is a German painter, graphic artist and draughtsman associated with the Leipzig School. His family fled to Leipzig in 1944 and he became a professional painter in 1952. His paintings often depict life in Leipzig and the cityscape itself from unusual perspectives. His style has been called "neoverist".
