= Sumair Apjit Singh =

Sikh royal and fashion-designer

- Rajkumari, Bibi
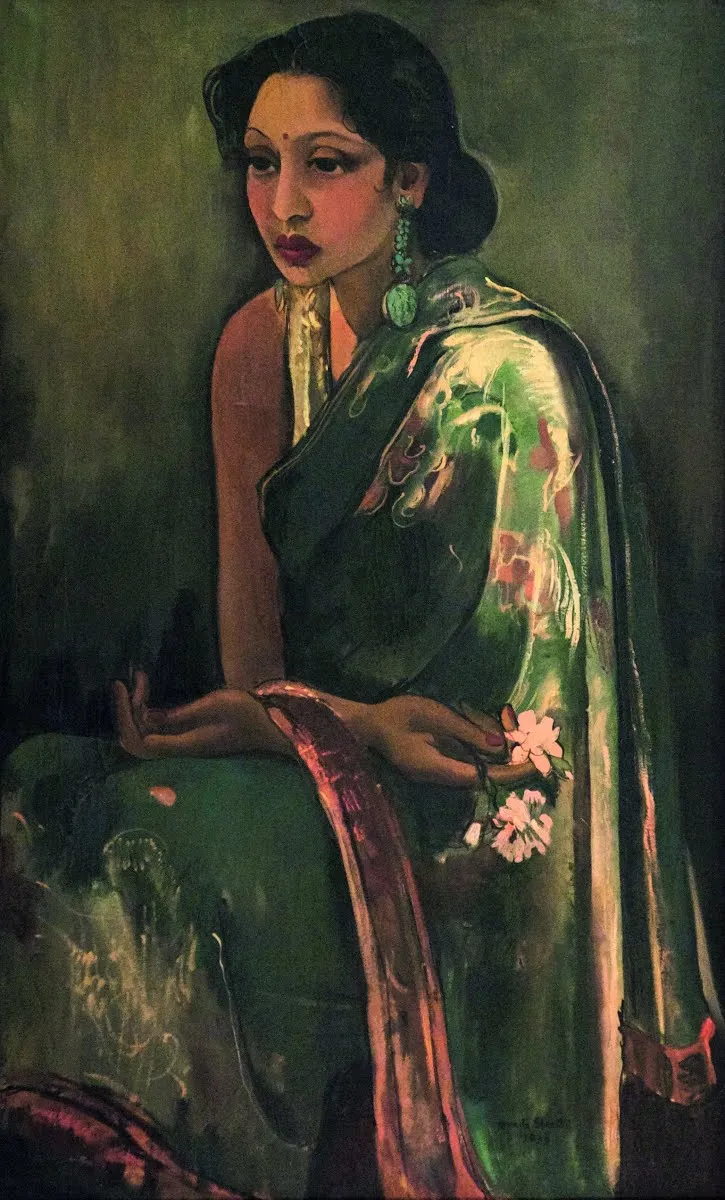
- Sumair by Amrita Sher-Gil, 1936
- Born: Sumair Kaur; 1918; Dehradun, India (claimed)
- Died: 15 May 2003 (aged 84–85); Milwaukee, United States of America
- House: Patiala (claimed) or Majithia
- Dynasty: Phulkian (claimed)
- Father: Bhupinder Singh (claimed) or Umrao Singh Sher-Gil
- Religion: Sikhism
- Occupation: Fashion-designer and seller

Rajkumari Sumair Apjit Singh (1918 – 2003), popularly known as Princess Sumair, also spelt Sumaire and nicknamed Sumi, was a Sikh royal, Axis sympathizer, and fashion-designer, being a claimed member of the royal family of Patiala. In the 1940s, Princess Sumair, claimed to be a familial relative of maharaja Bhupinder Singh of Patiala State, also claiming to be the cousin of famous Sikh painter Amrita Sher-Gil, resided in Shanghai during the period of Japanese-occupation and lived a scandalous lifestyle focused on money, fashion and men. (Note: Various sources have described her relationship to Bhupinder Singh of Patiala State as her being either a sister, daughter, or niece of his.) She may have falsified being the daughter of Maharaja Bhupinder Singh and may have actually been either the daughter or granddaughter of Umrao Singh Sher-Gil. She features as the subject in several surviving portraits by Amrita Sher-Gill. Sumair was a bisexual and bigamous.

Sumair was raised in Patiala, developing a fondness for Western culture and fashion from a young age. She was sent to England to be educated. Sumair arrived in Shanghai in July 1940 after being disowned by her family due to her reportedly "loose morals". She became entangled with the Axis during her time in Shanghai and may have spied for the Japanese. Later, she led a successful career in banking and fashion. Sumair had a PhD in economics from Cambridge University. Harriet Shapiro described her as "the most expensive designer in the world today" in 1980. Her life in Shanghai is recorded by Bernard Wasserstein in Secret War in Shanghai.

== Family background and early life ==
Sumair was born as Sumair Kaur in 1918 at Sanaur Fort and she likely spent her early-years at the Moti Bagh Palace in Patiala, Punjab, India. According to Linda Rodriguez McRobbie, Sumair's American death record claims she was born on 17 June 1928. According to Sumair herself, she was private about her birth-year but claimed to have been born at Dehradun in around 1930, although she was actually born in 1918. According to Bernard Wasserstein, the exact relationship of Sumair to the Patiala ruling dynasty of India was never determined, as Maharaja Bhupinder Singh had many illegitimate children (52 children from 8 wives and over 150 concubines), including daughters. Sumair may have been one of this illegitimate daughters. According to one report, Maharaja Bhupinder Singh had legitimized Sumair as his daughter shortly prior to his death in 1938. However, another report refers to her as being the niece of the maharaja and likely his mistress as well. She may have falsified the claim that she was the daughter of Maharaja Bhupinder Singh. Sumair was the cousin of Amrita Sher-Gil. Umrao Singh Sher-Gil, father of Amrita, had a child named Sumair with the daughter of Gulab Singh, his first marriage before he married the Hungarian mother of Amrita. Bobby Singh Bansal lists a "Sumeer Kaur" as being the daughter of Balram Singh (1879–1922, son of Umrao Singh Sher-Gil) and Harchand Kaur of Patiala, with her having two brothers named Ranjit Singh and Samarjit Singh.

As a young girl, Sumair would bribe the children of the French cook working at Patiala to buy her European fashion-magazines at the Patiala railway station and American movies. She was raised by English governesses due to her mother being pre-occupied with struggling with the fact that the maharaja had many mistresses. She herself claimed to have been a naughty child, bringing chickens and monkeys into the palace, thus she was put into the closet as a child as punishment, which made her develop a fear of the dark. At the age of four, she was engaged to an Indian prince but the marriage never occurred. At the age of eight, she was sent to study in England and studied economics at Cambridge. At Cambridge, she obtained an M.A. in English and a PhD in economics. Her brother, the future maharaja, was angry when she stated her desire was to become a dress-maker, as the work was associated with low-castes in her native India.

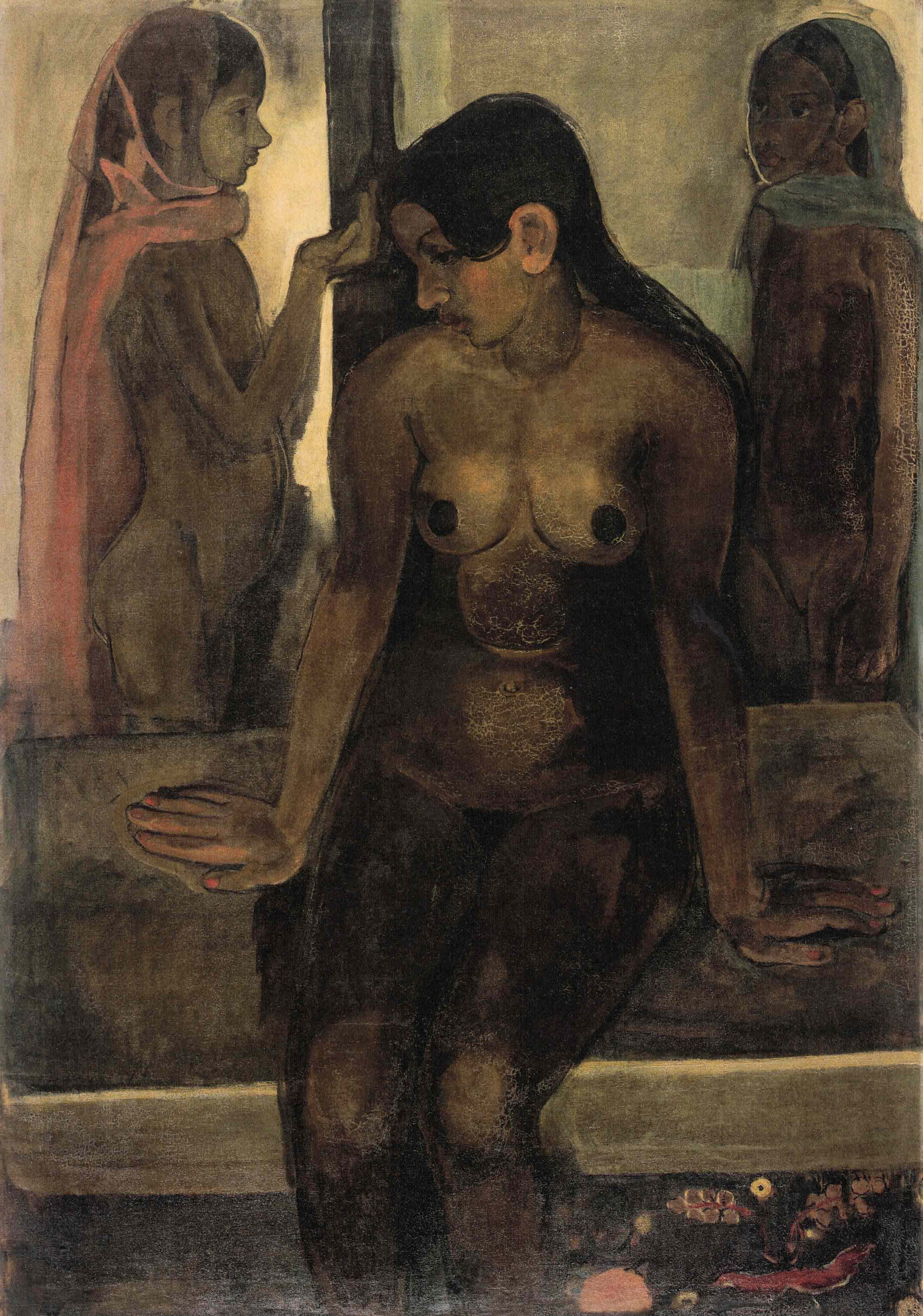
Nude Group, by Amrita Sher-Gill, 1935. In the foreground is Sumair Kaur.

In her early teens, Sumair was married to a senior official of the Indian State Railways named Sirdah Apjit Singh with her having a child from this marriage but the couple would later separate. In 1937, she travelled with her father Bhupinder Singh to England but the two had an argument and Sumair did not maintain a relationship with most of her family after that except for her mother. In 1938, while she was living in England (which she had travelled to for the coronation), she met the sculptor Jacob Epstein and modelled for him. Sumair lived in Paris, France with her mother in 1938, working as a model for designer Elsa Schiaparelli. After the death of her father (who had left Sumair a large inheritance) and the succession of Yadvinder Singh to the throne of Patiala, the new maharaja in 1939 ordered Sumair and her mother to return to India due to the onset of the Second World War. However, Sumair's mother went to the United States instead while Sumair returned to Patiala. But Sumair could not adapt to her life in Patiala as she considered herself to be Westernized. Her mother, who was living in Los Angeles, California, invited Sumair to visit her, which Sumair took her up on as she was not enjoying her life in Patiala. On the way there, Sumair travelled to Shanghai but never left Shanghai and remained there instead of continuing onward to the United States to meet her mother.

== Later life ==
She arrived in Shanghai in the summer of July 1940 at the age of 22, being enamored by the city, first staying at the Cathay Hotel, before settling in at the Park Hotel at the end of summer. Although Sumair was not conventionally physically attractive facially and rather short (standing either 4'11" or 5'1" tall, a size 6), she dressed in an exotic fashion style that attracted curiosity. Sumair was able to establish friendships with socialites, dancers, property tycoons, officers, and officials. Furthermore, she developed many relations with a series of men from different walks of life, after attracting them to her. She had affairs with both men and women. However, in December 1941 she was in poor financial condition but when the Japanese invaded and occupied the city, she was able to begin holding parties for the German, Italian, and Japanese spies and intelligence officials in the city.

In April 1943 at Shanghai, she married a Japanese-American man named Takami Morihiko, who had connections to the Shanghai-based criminal contacts. Morihiko, who was originally from Brooklyn, served the Japanese imperial interests and spying efforts in Shanghai, which made him be categorized as a traitor by the Americans. Morihiko would later be captured in Manila after Americans liberated the Philippines from Japanese occupation but escaped prosecution as a traitor as him serving in the Japanese military had forfeited his American citizenship. Sumair is also accused of spying for the Japanese and supporting them during her time in Shanghai. After the fall of the Japanese Empire in 1945 with the end of World War II, Sumair was in a poor financial situation after the liberation of Shanghai in September 1945 so she wrote to the maharaja of Patiala, requesting money be sent to her to support her. It is rumoured she eloped with an American soldier in 1946 and disappeared from Shanghai, trying to find a way to the United States. However, later events of her life in Europe and America are on historical record, where she worked as a fashion designer and seller. She resurfaces in Paris, France in the early 1950s.

In the early 1950s, it was reported in the press that Sumair had £900,000 in earnings annually from her salon in Paris, serving clientele such as the Shah of Iran's wife. In the early 1960s, Sumair ran an haute couture house on Avenue Georges Cinq in Paris. One day, Woolworth heiress Barbara Hutton visited and wrote her a $250,000 check for most of the spring collection. In 1967, Sumair closed her Parisian store and began working as a financial adviser for several Swiss banks. In 1977, she married a Milwaukee-local named Jack Boughton (sources describe him as a European furrier), whom she resided with at the Olympic Tower in Manhattan, New York. In June 1979, she returned to the fashion industry. She set up her headquarters in New York City with a stockpile of $600,000 worth of Swiss fashion goods. Her customers included the Rockefellers, wealthy South Americans, Saudi royals, and American tycoons. She had a store on Fifth Avenue. Together with her husband John, she operated the Princess Sumair Corporation, which was a haute couture collection specializing in gowns and pret-a-porter sold via Bergdorf Goodman and Saks Fifth Avenue. She was profiled by People magazine in May 1980. Not much is known about her life after 1983. Sumair died in Milwaukee on 15 May 2003. The connection between the Sumair of Shanghai and the later fashion-designer is confirmed by the physical similarities in the woman photographed in the two different eras and similar upbringing and origin narratives they told.

== Fashion ==
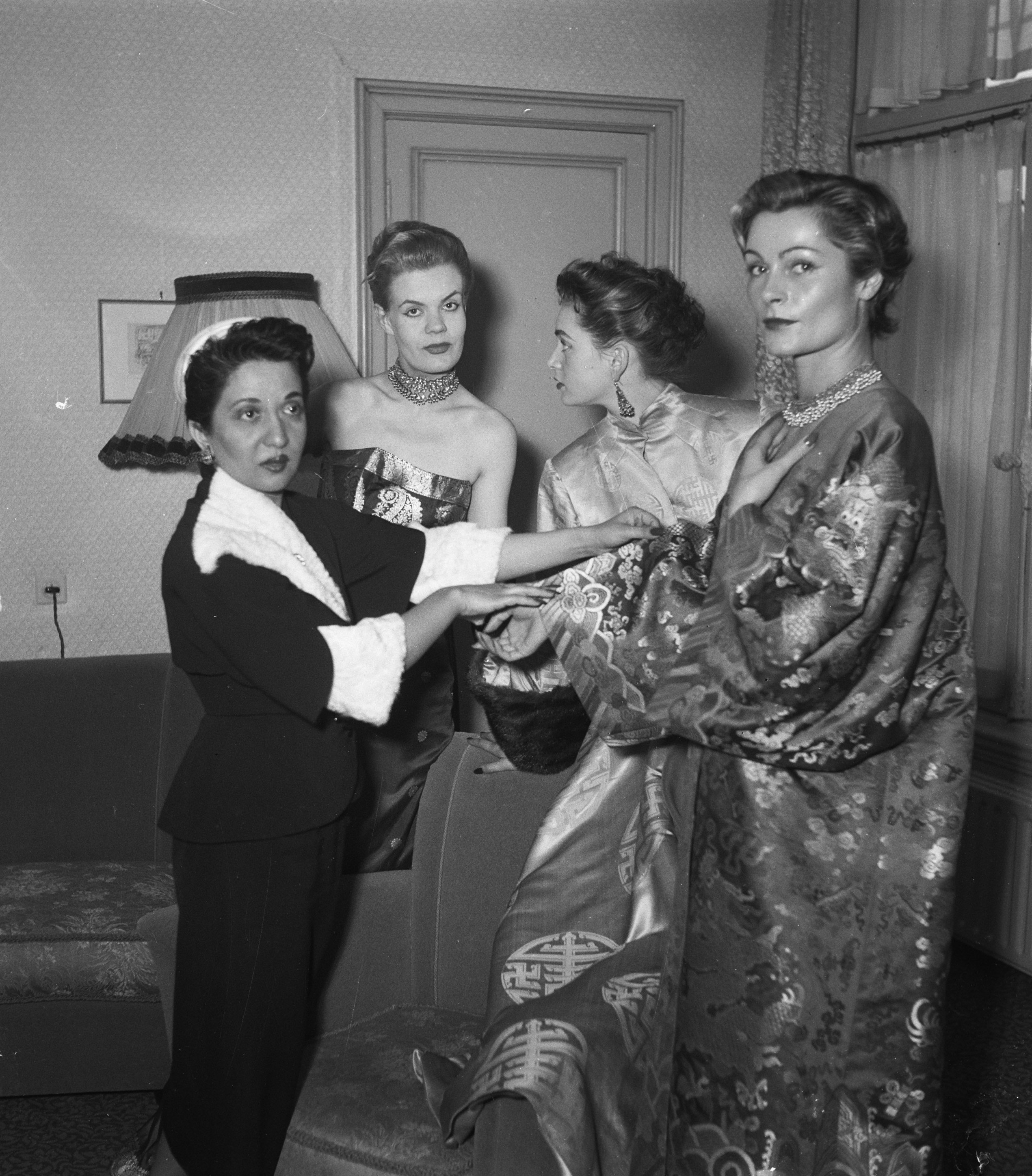
Princess Sumair fashion designer visits Amsterdam, 8 March 1952

Sumair's fashion style and designs had French influences but became increasingly Americanized. She utilized fabrics sourced from France and Italy and embroidery from Switzerland. Sumair practiced and designed upon the principle of simple and elegant fashion during the day and glamorous fashion for the night. She did not have assistant designers under her, with pieces ordered by her clients being created by Sumair's staff consisting of seamstresses and cutters. Due to her petite physical size, Sumair could not model most of her own designs.

In 1951, Sumair began creating Indian-inspired clothing for the rich in Paris. Sumair when she was in Paris believed that the local fashion lacked glitter or sparkle. Thus, she designed clothes made out of gold, which she lauded as never falling into disrepair since moths do not like gold. In the early 1950s in Paris, Sumair designed based upon Indian saris, Chinese satins, and Oriental brocade. In autumn 1980, she focused on day-into-evening dresses and gowns for gala nights.

== Marriages ==
- Sirdah Apjit Singh (circa 1920s–30s, separated)
- Takami Morihiko (married April 1943)
- John "Jack" Williams Boughton (married 1977) (Note: Also known as "Jack".) - He died on 30 January 2022.
