= Any Wintry Afternoon in England =

Painting by C.R.W. Nevinson

- Artist: C.R.W. Nevinson
- Year: 1930
- Type: Oil on canvas, genre painting
- Dimensions: 61.1 cm × 76.3 cm (24.1 in × 30.0 in)
- Location: Manchester Art Gallery, Manchester

Any Wintry Afternoon in England is a 1930 oil painting by the British artist C.R.W. Nevinson. It depicts a football match being played on a crisp winters day against the backdrop of an industrial landscape.

Nevinson first made his name as a Futurist before the First World War and continued to produce modernist works. It was first exhibited in 1934. The painting is now in the collection of Manchester Art Gallery which acquired ot via a gift in 2008.

== Bibliography ==
- Kramer, Andreas & Strożek, Przemysław.Sport and the European Avant-Garde (1900-1945). Brill, 2022.
- Walker, Stella A. British Sporting Art in the Twentieth Century. Sportsman's Press, 1989.
- Walsh, Michael J.K. Hanging a Rebel: The Life of C.R.W. Nevinson. Lutterworth, 2008.
