= Luis Marsans =

Spanish artist

Lluís Marsans i Julià (31 December 1930 – 16 January 2015) was a Catalan painter. Born in Barcelona to a wealthy family, he grew up in Paris, and in 1947 traveled to Mexico and the United States. In 1948 he returned to Barcelona where he studied painting with Ramon Rogent and became loosely associated with the Dau al Set group. In the mid-1950s he became friends with Marcel Duchamp. In the mid-1960s, he destroyed the abstract art he had been making and, influenced by Ramón Gaya, dedicated himself to figurative work. Between 1966 and 1970, he explored the world of Marcel Proust's work In Search of Lost Time in a suite of drawings which he exhibited at Trece Gallery in Barcelona in 1972. In 1980 he had a solo exhibition at Galerie Claude Bernard, Paris. In 1985 he was included in the group show Representation Abroad at the Hirshhorn Museum and Sculpture Garden in Washington, D.C.

Marsans painted many still-lifes and landscapes, usually in small formats and using mixed techniques. He is known especially for paintings of shelves filled with books, a subject he painted more than a hundred times. In 1985, John Ashbery wrote that Marsans' works "suggest nineteenth-century American trompe-l'œil painting. Steeped in the light of memory, a Coke can and a Bic lighter become votive objects..." Described as a realist, Marsans says of his relationship to realism: "One cannot paint what one sees.... One can only paint what one remembers.... It [realism] is the identification with some realities from the past".
