= Hotel Statler =

Hotel Statler may refer to:

- Statler Hotels, chain of hotels founded by Ellsworth Milton (E. M.) Statler
- former name of Hotel Pennsylvania in New York City, see Hotel Pennsylvania#History
- Hotel Statler (St. Louis, Missouri), listed on the NRHP in Missouri
- Hotel Statler, building listed on the NRHP in Cleveland, Ohio
- The Statler Hotel, the teaching hotel of the Cornell University School of Hotel Administration
