= Andreas Walser =

Swiss painter (1908–1930)

- Born: 13 April 1908; Chur, Switzerland
- Died: 19 March 1930 (aged 21); Paris, France
- Known for: Painting, writing and photography

Andreas Walser (13 April 1908 – 19 March 1930) was a Swiss painter, writer and photographer. Born in Chur, he was encouraged by Augusto Giacometti and Ernst Ludwig Kirchner before moving to Paris in 1928. His work drew on synthetic Cubism and several modernist currents.

== Biography ==
Andreas Walser was born on 13 April 1908 in Chur. He attended the gymnasium in Chur and completed his Matura in 1928. As a school student, he was already pursuing art and received encouragement from Augusto Giacometti and Ernst Ludwig Kirchner, both of whom recognised his talent and supported his artistic development.

From 1928, Walser worked in his own studio in Paris. At the end of 1928, he met Pablo Picasso, followed in early 1929 by Jean Cocteau. Maurice Tabard introduced him to photography in 1929. Walser worked intensively as both a painter and writer, and his work attracted attention from art dealers and collectors.

Alongside his painting, Walser wrote prose, poems and aphorisms in German and French. His Paris years included intense periods of work as well as episodes of illness, and he continued to spend time in Graubünden. In early 1930, after a period of convalescence, he stayed for several weeks in Marseille and on Corsica before returning to Paris. He died in Paris on 19 March 1930, shortly before his twenty-second birthday.

== Work ==
Walser worked as a painter, writer and photographer. His early works showed the influence of Augusto Giacometti and Ernst Ludwig Kirchner. In Paris, his still lifes and portraits were shaped mainly by synthetic Cubism. Some works also drew on Dadaist, Surrealist and abstract approaches. His photographic work included a small number of photograms.

Walser’s work drew on several modernist currents, but he did not align himself with a single movement. During his lifetime, some of his works were exhibited and sold. His 1930 oil painting Baigneurs (Am Strand) is held by the Bündner Kunstmuseum Chur. Other works are held in collections including the Kirchner Museum Davos.

== Legacy ==
After Walser’s death, his work fell into obscurity. Only a small part of his estate returned to Switzerland in 1930, while the whereabouts of many works from his Paris period remain unknown. Important works and documents reappeared in the 1980s, allowing a reassessment of his biography and artistic activity. His work was presented in retrospectives in Chur and Winterthur in 1994–1995 and at the Centre culturel suisse in Paris in 1996. In 2007, Heinz Bütler and Wolfgang Frei documented his life in the film and book Die Nacht ist heller als der Tag.

== Gallery ==
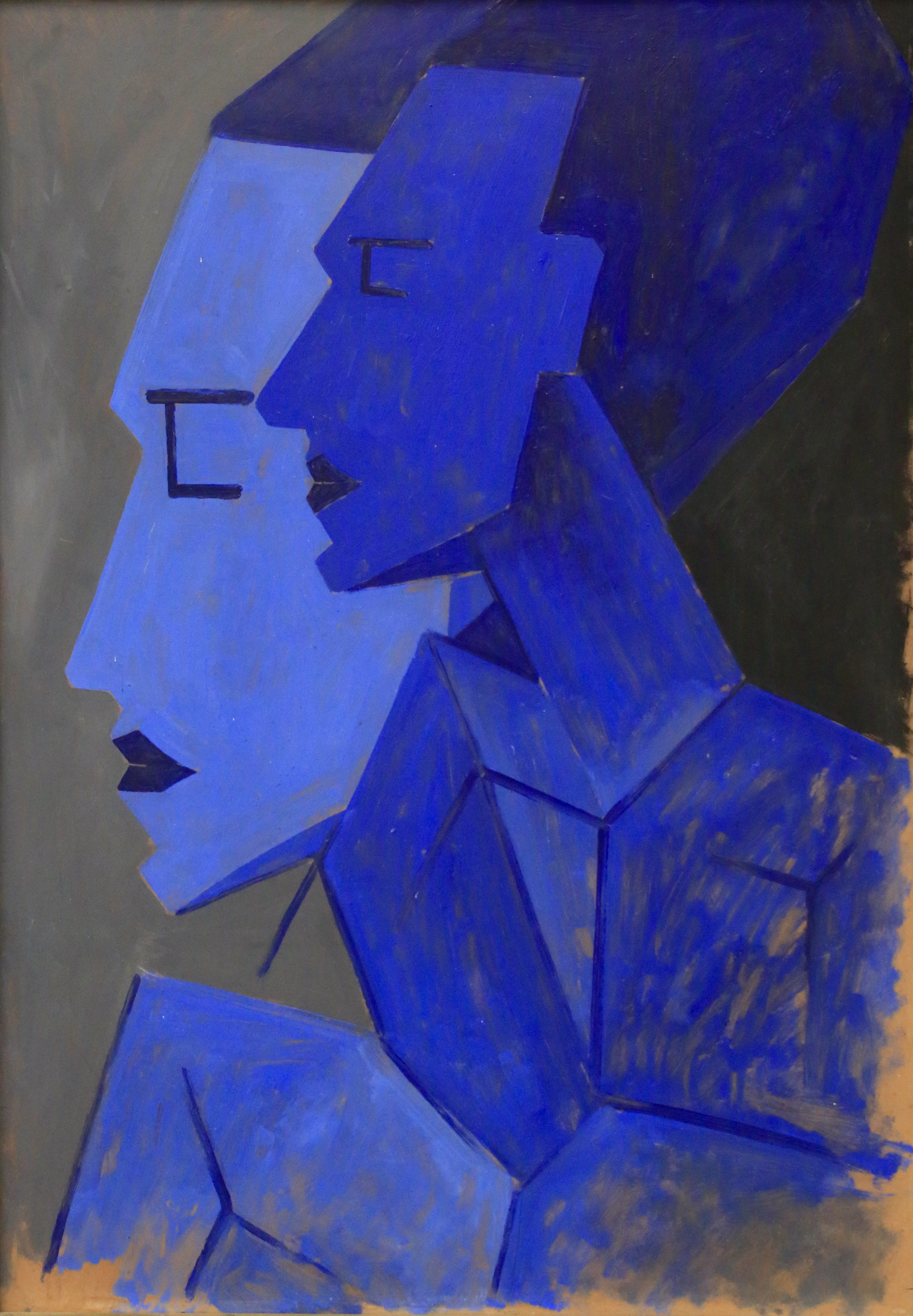
Blue heads

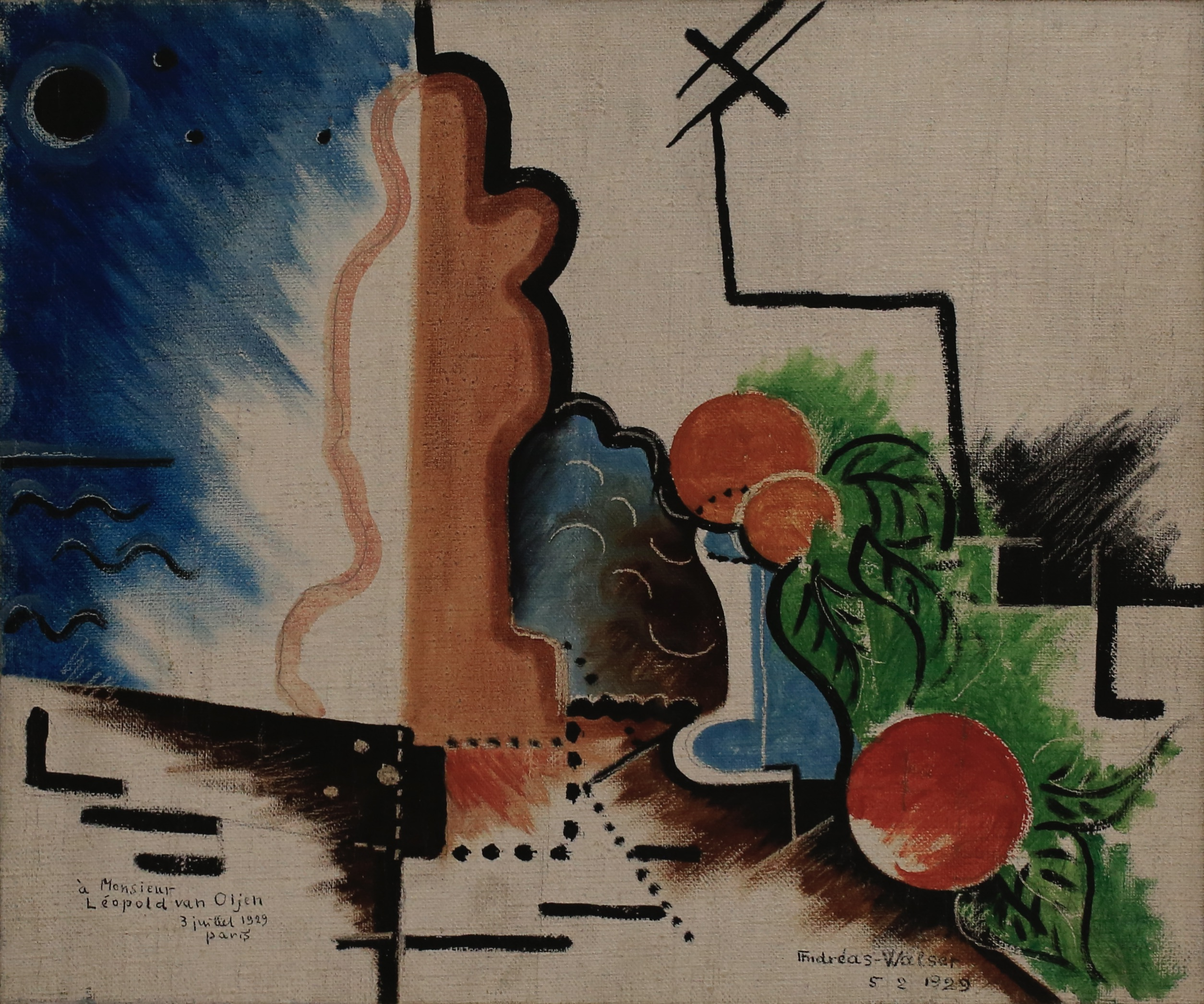
Still life with black moon

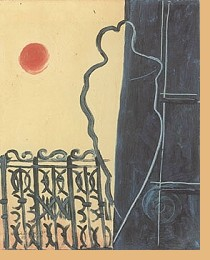
Title unknown
