= Young Girls (painting) =

1932 painting by Amrita Sher-Gil

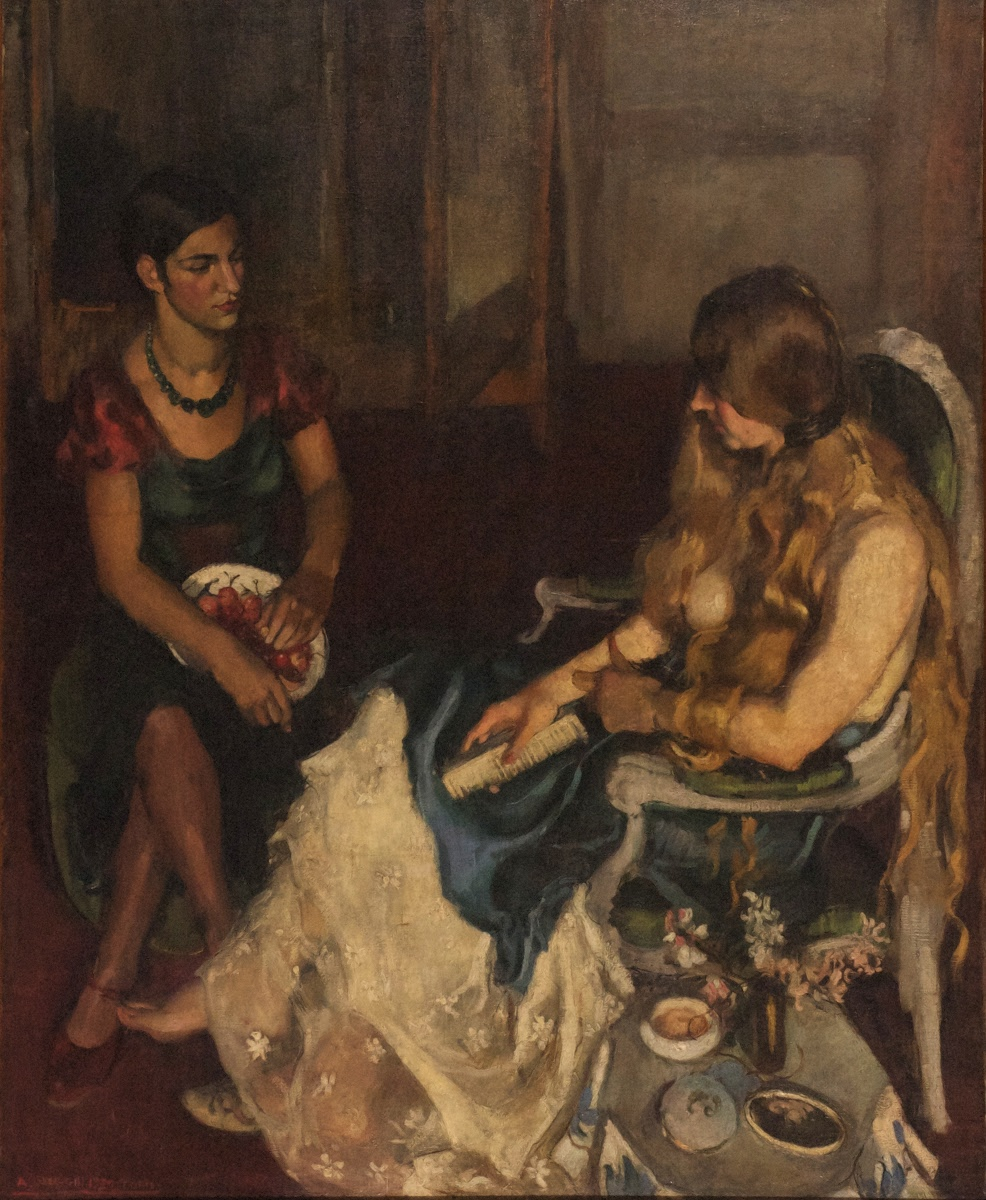
- Artist: Amrita Sher-Gil
- Year: 1932
- Medium: Oil on canvas
- Dimensions: 164 cm × 133 cm (65 in × 52 in)
- Location: National Gallery of Modern Art at Jaipur House; New Delhi
- Owner: Government of India
- Followed by: Professional Model

Young Girls is an oil on canvas painting created by Amrita Sher-Gil in 1932 in Paris. It was awarded a gold medal at the 1933 Paris Salon and earned Sher-Gil an associate membership of that institution. It is a national art treasure under India's Antiquities and Art Treasures Act (1972), and is held at the National Gallery of Modern Art at Jaipur House, New Delhi.

As a child, Sher-Gil was encouraged by her uncle, Ervin Baktay, to carefully observe the reality around her and transfer it to her work. She was studying art at Beaux-Arts de Paris, when she painted Young Girls. Set in an affluent home, it depicts two women in close conversation modelled on her sister and a friend. The dark woman is positioned upright and the light skin woman is slouched, with her blonde hair partially covering a naked breast.

Several commentators have seen the painting as reflecting Sher-Gil's divided identity: Indian, European, colonial subject, and female.

== Background ==
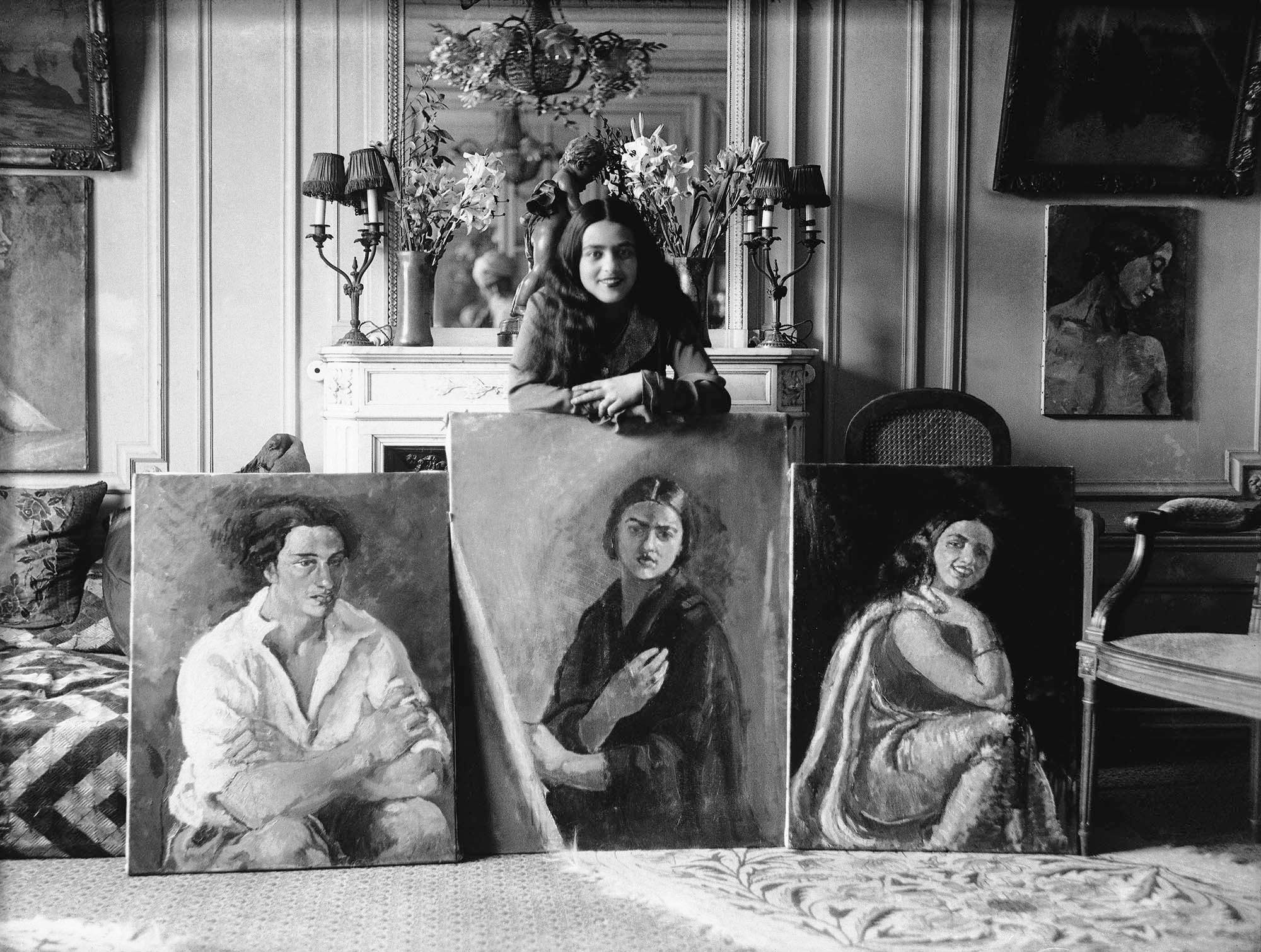
Amrita Sher-Gil with three of her paintings in Paris

Amrita Sher-Gil (1913–1941) was born in Hungary to an Indian aristocrat and his artistic Hungarian wife. After the First World War the family moved to Simla, India, where she spent her early teens. There, she was influenced by her uncle, Ervin Baktay, who introduced her to Nagybánya artistic methods and plein air painting. He encouraged her to carefully observe the reality around her and transfer it to her work, particularly using live models. In 1929, at the suggestion of Baktay, the family moved to Paris so that Sher-Gil could study art; she was then 16 years and was admitted at first to the Académie de la Grande Chaumière and later the Beaux-Arts de Paris. Between 1930 and 1932, in Paris, she created over 60 oil paintings, including Young Girls, completed in 1932 at the age of 19. Two years later she would return to India where her style of painting would concentrate on painting Indians.

== Description ==
Young Girls is a portrait painting in oil on canvas, which measures 164 cm × 133 cm (65 in × 52 in). Set in an affluent home, it depicts two similarly aged women sat on chairs in close proximity. The dark woman, modelled by Sher-Gil's sister Indira, is positioned upright and appears to have a smirk. Her attire is western and neat, and her hair combed back. In the foreground is a tabletop, and Indira has a plate of cherries on her lap. The light skin woman, modelled by a friend, Denise Proutaux, is slouched, with her blonde hair partially covering a naked breast. Her right foot is shown bare. They face each other, appearing to be in conversation. There is a half-closed cupboard in the background.

In 1942, Esmet Rahim (a painter and friend of Sher-Gil) described the painting as "an interior scene, depicting two young women sitting casually in a room, they are not doing anything interesting, they are not made to look pretty or intriguing, they are just two young girls, one fair and one dark".

== Reception ==
Young Girls earned a place at the 1933 Paris Salon, one year after Sher-Gil exhibited her first painting there. One of Sher-Gil's tutors had compared her with Gustave Courbet, to which she responded to her cousin and later husband Victor, in a letter dated February 1933, that "I will be myself". Another former teacher viewed it as one of the best at the Salon, to which she told Victor that that "is not difficult". Sher-Gil was typically one of her own critics. That month also saw the vernissage of her Professional Model, a portrait of a nude consumptive that Sher-Gil felt was far superior to Young Girls. Young Girls earned her the Salon's gold medal, making her the first Asian to be awarded it. The institution made her an associate, allowing her to exhibit two paintings every year without the need for a jury. In May 1933, Sher-Gil wrote to Victor that "I have been selected as an extraordinary member of the Salon. However, I don't think very highly of them - they are very - haughty".

In her own account in a 1937 The Indian Ladies Magazine, Sher-Gil clarifies that the painting earned her the position of associate at the Salon and says that it "was declared Picture of the Year". In 1933 there were several pictures of the year at Paris; The Sphere newspaper (1933) included Miss Hermione and Mrs Claude Chauvin, both by Alfred Jonniaux, Le Rat by M. Philippe Ledoux, Vocation Précoce by Jane Chaueur-Ozeel, and La Convalescence by Madeleine Weill-Lestienne. Abdul Khan Hamid, the notable art critic and brother of Zubeida Agha, noted that that year Young Girls was "picture of the year". This was reiterated by biographer of Sher-Gil, N. Iqbal Singh.

== Interpretation and legacy ==
Several commentators have seen the painting as reflecting Sher-Gil's divided identity. Katalin Keserü, who curated several Sher-Gil exhibitions, sees the painting as "east meets west". In Yashodhara Dalmia's biography of Sher-Gil, she sees the two women as two different aspects of Sher-Gil herself. Dalmia asks "could the two girls represent facets of Amrita's own persona?" She notes in general that Sher-Gil's paintings in Paris followed a search for her European-Indian identity, in addition to following her Paris school academic teachings. In Young Girls, Dalmia interprets "the strict upright pose of the dark woman" as equally "matched by the abandon of the fair-haired woman", saying that "the dark, oriental woman [is] in a position of equality with the white woman, sharing her privileges with elan." Sher-Gil's later painting Two Girls would expand on this theme, and her portraits of women close to each other would also become a recurring theme. Dalmia would quote in her book that Rahim's response was that "the picture as a whole is captivating. Nothing betrays the fact that the picture is the work of a girl of 19. It is powerful, almost masculine in its vigour."

Art historian, Saloni Mathur, agrees with Vivan Sundaram that the painting is "complex", with the portrayal of "a brown and a white woman together in their nudity ambiguously, as possible lovers, or, in an alternative reading, as a form of self-portraiture that projected her own racially divided self". Vogue India's review of Sunil Khilnani's Incarnations: A History of India in 50 Lives (2017) describes the painting as having a "mysterious tension". Charlie Connelly in The New European (2021) called the painting a work of "outstanding insight and technique". Art historian Susie Hodge, wrote in her book Artistic Circles (2021), that Young Girls reflects Sher-Gil's sexuality and the different aspects of her personality. A review in the Journal of International Women's Studies (2022) points to the significance of the contrasting postures of the girls; "while the French woman is casually careless and relaxed, Indira is sitting cross-legged, neat, and proper in her manner. It is often implied that the two postures and identities reflect on the artist’s own divided self, and, possibly, colonial relationships, even sexual ambiguity". After Sher-Gil's death, Rahim pointed out that Sher-Gil herself did not think much of the painting.

=== Antiquities and Art Treasures Act (1972) ===
Under India's Antiquities and Art Treasures Act (1972), formed in accordance with the UNESCO 1970 Convention to regulate the internal and external dealing in antiquities in India, the Archaeological Survey of India in 1976 and 1979, named Sher-Gil's works as Indian treasure that if sold in India, cannot leave the country. Young Girls is housed at the National Gallery of Modern Art at Jaipur House, New Delhi, and must stay in India.

== See also ==
- List of paintings by Amrita Sher-Gil

== Bibliography ==
- Sundaram, Vivan (2010). Amrita Sher-Gil: A Self-Portrait in Letters and Writings. Vol. 1. New Delhi: Tulika Books. pp. 1–417. ISBN 978-81-89487-59-1.
- Sundaram, Vivan (2010). Amrita Sher-Gil: A Self-Portrait in Letters and Writings. Vol. 2. New Delhi: Tulika Books. pp. 418–821. ISBN 978-81-89487-59-1.
- Dalmia, Yashodhara (2013). Amrita Sher-Gil: A Life. Gurugram: Penguin Books. ISBN 978-0-14-342026-2.
