= Kalyan Sundaram =

Indian civil servant (1904–1992)

Kuthur Vaidyanathan Kalyan Sundaram

2nd Chief Election Commissioner of India
- In office 20 December 1958 – 30 September 1967
- Preceded by: Sukumar Sen
- Succeeded by: SP Sen Verma

Personal details
- Born: 11 May 1904 Kuttur, Madras Presidency
- Died: 23 September 1992 (aged 88) New Delhi, India
- Spouse: Indira Sundaram
- Children: Vivan Sundaram; Navina Sundaram
- Awards: Padma Vibhushan (1968)

Kuthur Vaidyanathan Kalyan Sundaram (11 May 1904 – 23 September 1992), also referred as K. V. K. Sundaram, was an Indian civil servant, who holds the record as the first Law Secretary (1948–58) of independent India and second Chief Election Commissioner of India (20 December 1958 – 30 September 1967). He also chaired the Fifth Law Commission of India for the period 1968–71. He was the principal author of the White Paper which was used to guide the formation of India into states drawn along linguistic lines after its independence. For this, he received personal thanks and high praise from Lord Louis Mountbatten. He was also a Sanskrit scholar, translating for English audiences the works of the Sanskrit writer Kalidasa. A man of humility and discretion, according to The Independent, Sundaram received in 1968 the second highest civilian award which can be bestowed by the Indian Government: the Padma Vibhushan.

== Personal life and education ==
Sundaram was native to Kuttur, a village located in the then-Madras Presidency. He was born in 1904, to a professor. An alumnus of Presidency College and Christ Church, Oxford, he registered himself in 1925 for the Indian Civil Services (ICS) training. Sundaram was married twice. His first wife, Laxmi, died in 1934. Afterwards he married Indira Sher-Gil, the sister of artist Amrita Sher-Gil, who bore him a son, Vivan, who is himself an artist and a daughter, Navina Sundaram.

== Career ==
Sundaram began his ICS career in the Central Provinces in 1927. He worked first in districts before in 1931 rising to the provincial level as a reforms officer in Nagpur. There, he demonstrated such legal acumen that Judicial Commissioner Sir Robert McNair later commented that Sundaram was one of the few junior legal officers whose recommendations he would take in disposing of cases without appraising it himself.

In 1935, the Government of India Act was implemented, which led to the setting up of an elected legislature in the Indian Provinces. This act was one of the first moves in the direction of giving India independence. Sundaram played an active role in that. The British bureaucracy governing India wanted to reorganise the existing structures of India into linguistically devised states, mindful of the existing boundaries of the hundreds of Princely States which the British did not control. They commissioned Sundaram in 1936 to prepare this document. This White Paper became the base used to reorganise India into states; Patel and V P Menon would also use it to convince the princes to cede with the Indian union for an agreed pension. Sundaram himself was able to oversee much of this work, as he rose to the position of Law Secretary in 1948 when Sir George Spence—who had years before specifically requested Sundaram for the office in spite of the seniority of other eligible candidates—stepped down.

== Later life and death ==
In 1958, after his term as the Law Secretary ended, Sundaram became the second person to hold the position of Chief Election Commissioner. In 1967, he departed that position to become Chairman of the Law Commission in 1968, the same year he received the Padma Vibhushan award. On leaving that role, in 1971, he again entered into boundary issues, helping address the Assam and Nagaland state disputes as adviser to the Home Ministry.

Sundaram died on 23 September 1992, in New Delhi of natural causes.
