= Marie Antoinette Gottesman =

Hungarian opera singer (1881–1948)

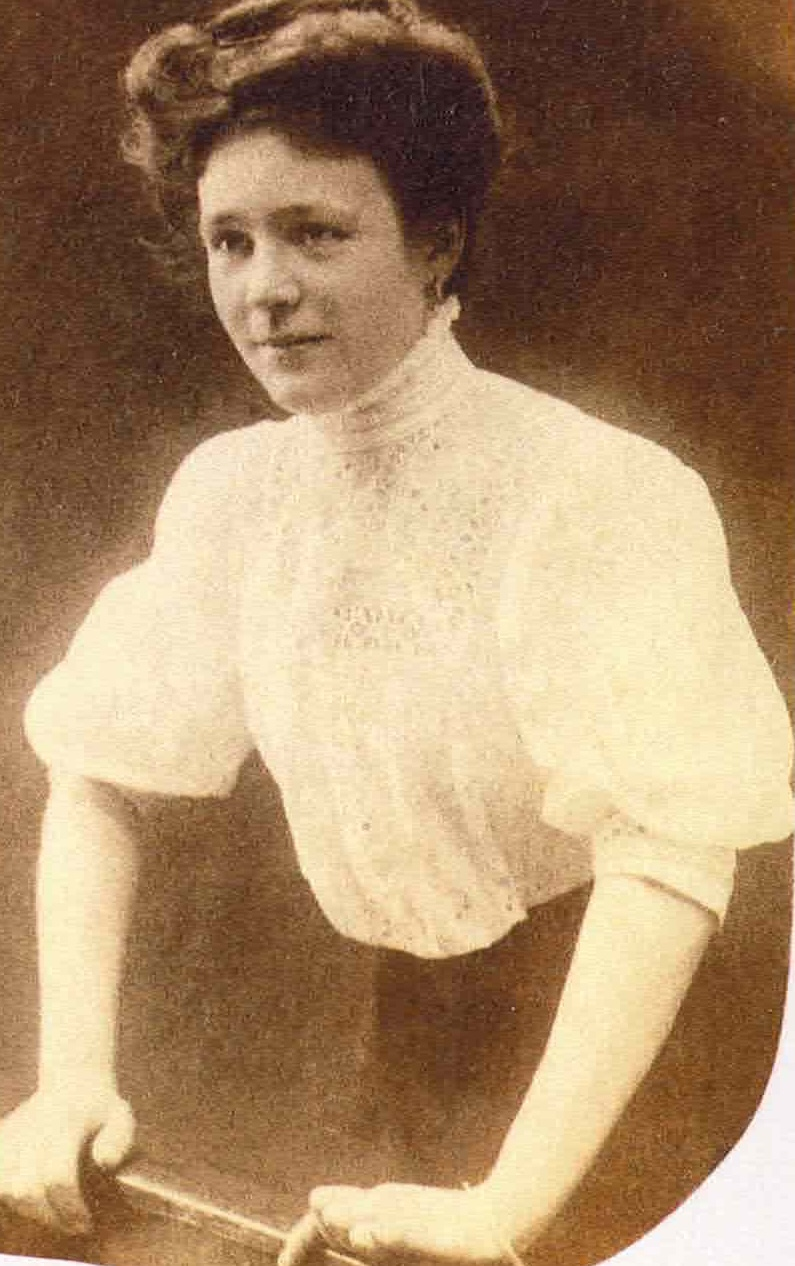
- Marie Antoinette c. 1910 (Budapest)
- Born: 4 February 1881
- Died: 1948 (aged 66–67)

Marie Antoinette Gottesman (4 February 1881–1948) was a Hungarian socialite, opera singer, sister of Ervin Baktay, wife of Umrao Singh Sher-Gil and mother of the artist Amrita Sher-Gil and her sister Indira Sundaram.

== Personal life ==
She married Umrao Singh Sher-Gil Majithia, an Indian Jat Sikh aristocrat and scholar from the Majithia family, in 1912. The couple had two daughters, Amrita Sher-Gil, a visual artist, and Indira Sundaram (née Sher-Gil).

Marie was affected deeply by her daughter Amrita's death in 1941. She believed Amrita's husband, Viktor Egan, was indirectly responsible. Marie committed suicide in 1948.

== Bibliography ==
- Dalmia, Yashodhara (2013). Amrita Sher-Gil: A Life. Gurugram: Penguin Books. ISBN 978-0-14-342026-2.
- Sundaram, Vivan (2010). Amrita Sher-Gil: A Self-Portrait in Letters and Writings. Vol. 1. New Delhi: Tulika Books. pp. 1–417. ISBN 978-81-89487-59-1.
- Sundaram, Vivan (2010). Amrita Sher-Gil: A Self-Portrait in Letters and Writings. Vol. 2. New Delhi: Tulika Books. pp. 418–821. ISBN 978-81-89487-59-1.
