= Professional Model =

1933 painting by Amrita Sher-Gil

- Artist: Amrita Sher-Gil
- Year: 1933
- Location: National Gallery of Modern Art, New Delhi

Professional Model is an oil on canvas painting by Amrita Sher-Gil. It was created in 1933 in Paris and depicts a nude consumptive. Its vernissage took place in February 1933, the same year that her painting Young Girls earned her the title of associate member of the Paris Salon.

The painting was number 16 of 33 of Sher-Gil's works displayed at her solo exhibition at Faletti's Hotel in Lahore, British India, held from 21 to 27 November 1937. There, it was not for sale.

== See also ==
- List of paintings by Amrita Sher-Gil

== Bibliography ==
- Dalmia, Yashodhara (2013). Amrita Sher-Gil: A Life. Gurugram: Penguin Books. ISBN 978-0-14-342026-2.
- Sundaram, Vivan (2010). Amrita Sher-Gil: A Self-Portrait in Letters and Writings. Vol. 1. New Delhi: Tulika Books. pp. 1–417. ISBN 978-81-89487-59-1.
- Sundaram, Vivan (2010). Amrita Sher-Gil: A Self-Portrait in Letters and Writings. Vol. 2. New Delhi: Tulika Books. pp. 418–821. ISBN 978-81-89487-59-1.
