= N. Iqbal Singh =

Indian writer and journalist

N. Iqbal Singh (28 September 1912-1 January 2001) was an Indian writer, journalist and broadcaster, known for his accounts of Amrita Sher-Gil, Muhammad Iqbal, Buddha, and the Andaman and Nicobar Islands.

== Early life and education ==
N. Iqbal Singh was born on 28 September 1912 in Abbottabad, then in British India and later in Pakistan. He completed his education in England and France.

== Works ==
In 1927 Singh published a book on Buddha. In London, he co-founded the magazine Indian Writing and was active with the India League. His book The ardent pilgrim: an introduction to the life and work of Mohammed Iqbal (1957) was initially declined by Allen & Unwin, and then published by Oxford University Press.

== Selected works ==
- Gautama Buddha. Oxford University Press. 1927. ISBN 978-0195639247.
- The ardent pilgrim: an introduction to the life and work of Mohammed Iqbal. Oxford University Press. 1951. ISBN 978-0195639797.
- The Andaman story. Vikas Publishing House. 1978. ISBN 978-0-70690-632-5.
- Amrita Sher-Gill: A Biography. Vikas Publishing House. 1984. ISBN 0-7069-2474-6.
