= Indira Sundaram =

Subject of portraits & photographs (1914–1975)

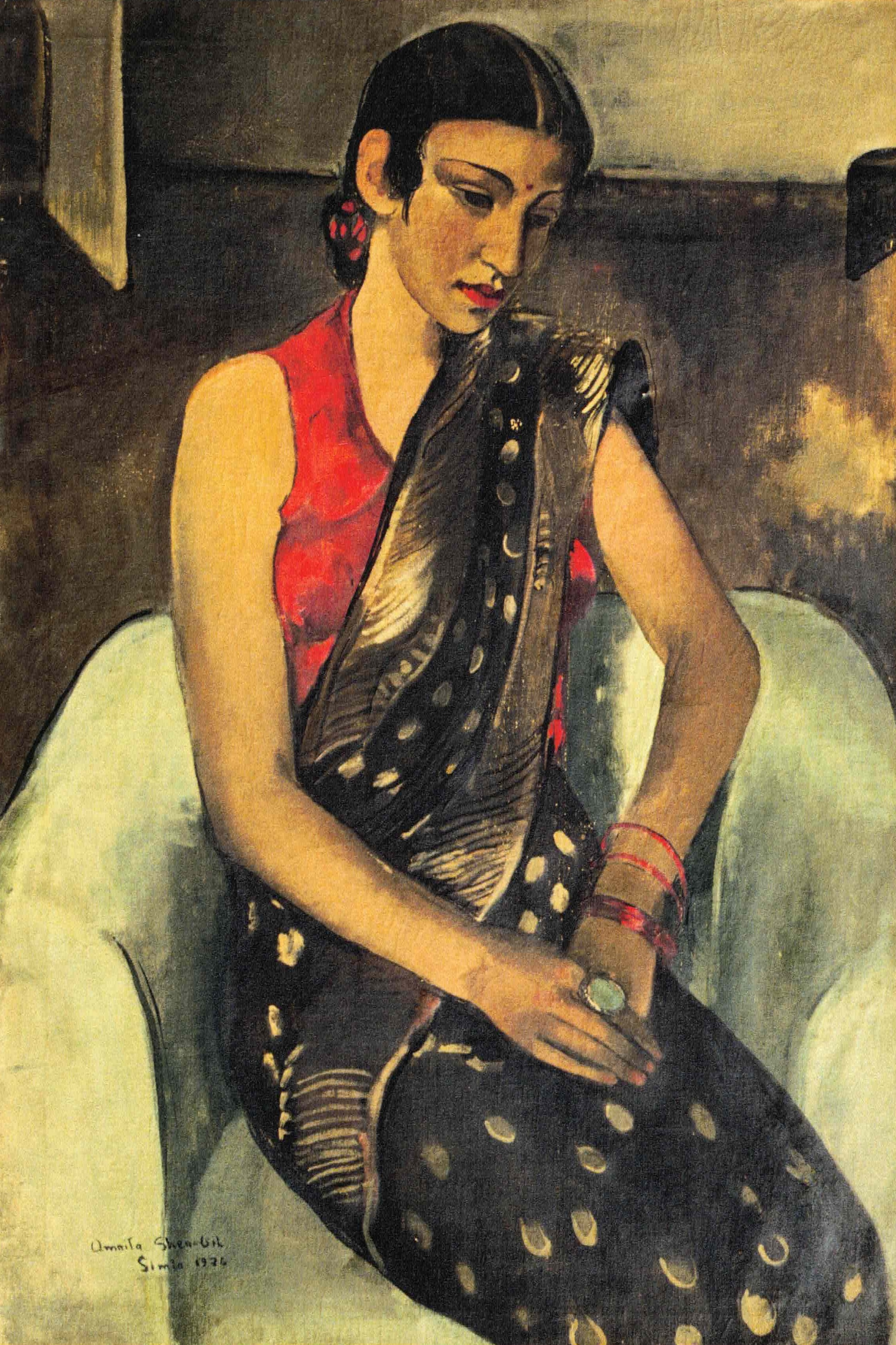
- Indira Sundaram by Amrita Sher-Gil, 1936
- Born: 28 March 1914; Buda Hills, Hungary
- Died: 1975 (aged 60–61)
- Known for: Feature of portraits by Amrita Sher-Gil, photographs by Umrao Singh Sher-Gil, art works by Vivan Sundaram
- Spouse: Kalyan Sundaram
- Children: Vivan Sundaram; Navina Sundaram
- Parents: Umrao Singh Sher-Gil (father); Marie Antoinette Gottesman (mother)

Indira Sundaram (née Sher-Gil; 28 March 1914 - 1975) was the subject of several paintings completed by her sister, Amrita Sher-Gil, photographs by her father Umrao Singh Sher-Gil, and art works by her son Vivan Sundaram.

== Early life and education ==
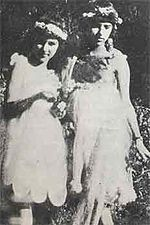
Sunderam with her sister Amrita, 1922

Indira Sher-Gil, affectionately known as Indu, was born on 28 March 1914 in a mansion located in the Buda Hills of Hungary. She was the daughter of the Indian aristrocat Umrao Singh Sher-Gil and his Hungarian wife Marie Antoinette Gottesman. The youngest of two siblings, her sister was Amrita Sher-Gil, who became a renowned painter and Indian national treasure. Indira moved to the Gottesman family mansion at Dunaharaszti in September 1916. She was baptized Roman Catholic on 17 November 1918. The family moved back to Budapest in June 1920, when they first stayed with Indira's aunt before moving to the Margaret Island Grand Hotel on the Danube and then to India in January 1921.

In 1929, during Indira's teens, the family moved to Paris, where they lived at first in Passy and then the more fashionable 11 Rue de Bassano, Place des États-Unis. There she was accepted into the Alfred Cortot School of Music, where she trained in piano.

== Personal and family ==
In October 1937, shortly before Amrita's solo exhibition at Lahore, Indira married Kalyan Sundaram, with whom she had two children, Vivan and Navina Sundaram.

== Paintings and photographs ==
Indira features in several paintings completed by her sister and numerous photographs taken by her father. Some of these images have been combined into art work by her son Vivan.

=== Young Girls ===
Indira was one of two models depicted in Sher-Gil's 1932 painting Young Girls. In it she posed in an upright position, in equal conversation with a fair-haired woman.

=== Sleep ===
Sleep, also known as Indu's Nude or Nude of Indira, was completed in 1933. It portrays Indira lying nude on a white sheet, viewed from above, with one arm raised. A shawl featuring a dragon lies beneath her, its shape echoing the curves of her body and hair. It nearly sold to Nawab Salar Jung and was later exhibited at Sher-Gil's solo show at Faletti's Hotel in Lahore in 1937. It was also displayed at the Indian Academy of Fine Arts exhibition in Amritsar in 1940. Though Sher-Gil and politician Diwan Chaman Lall tried to sell the painting, it remained unsold and is now housed in the National Gallery of Modern Art in New Delhi.

=== Gallery ===
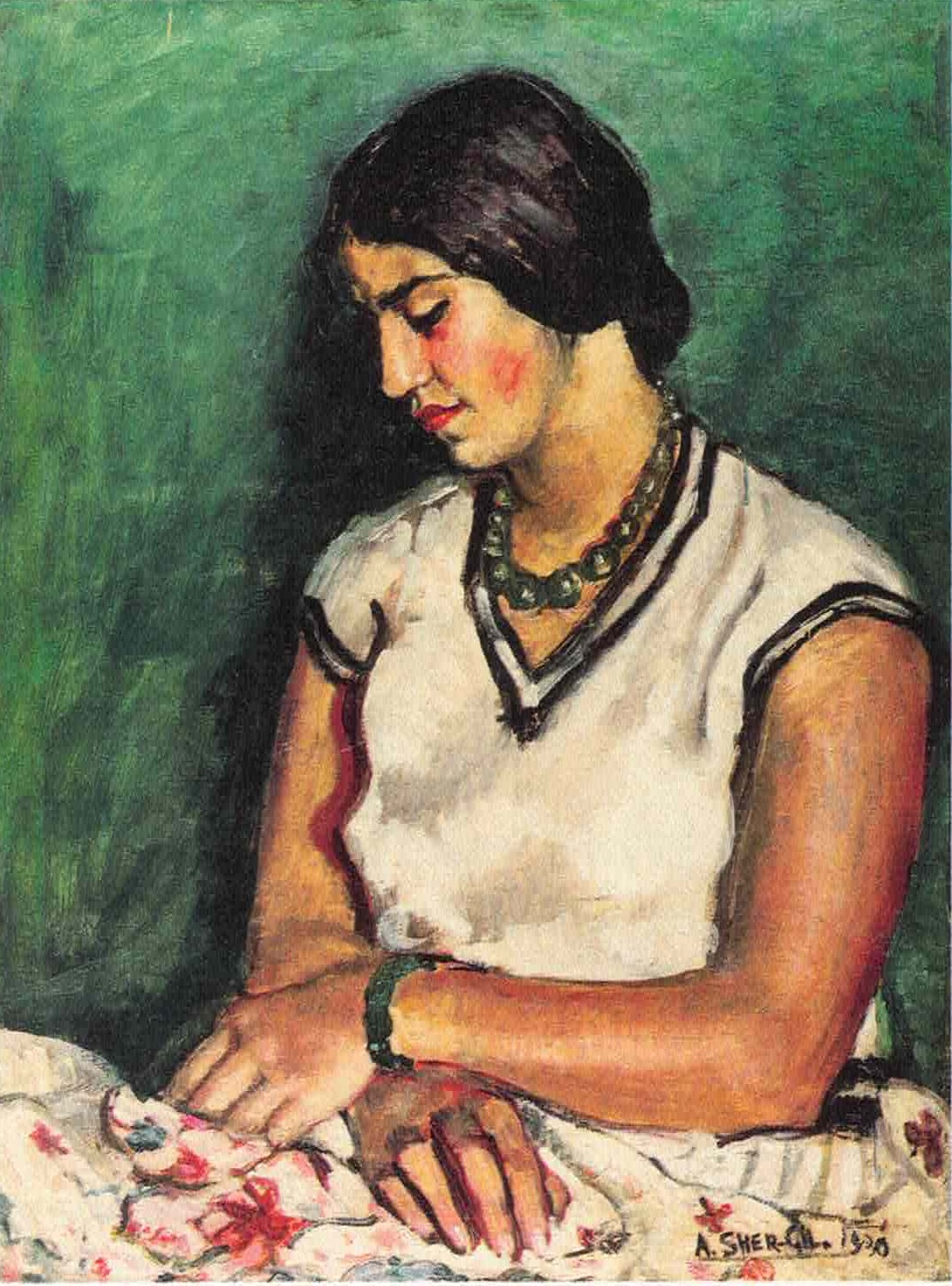
Portrait of My Sister (1930)

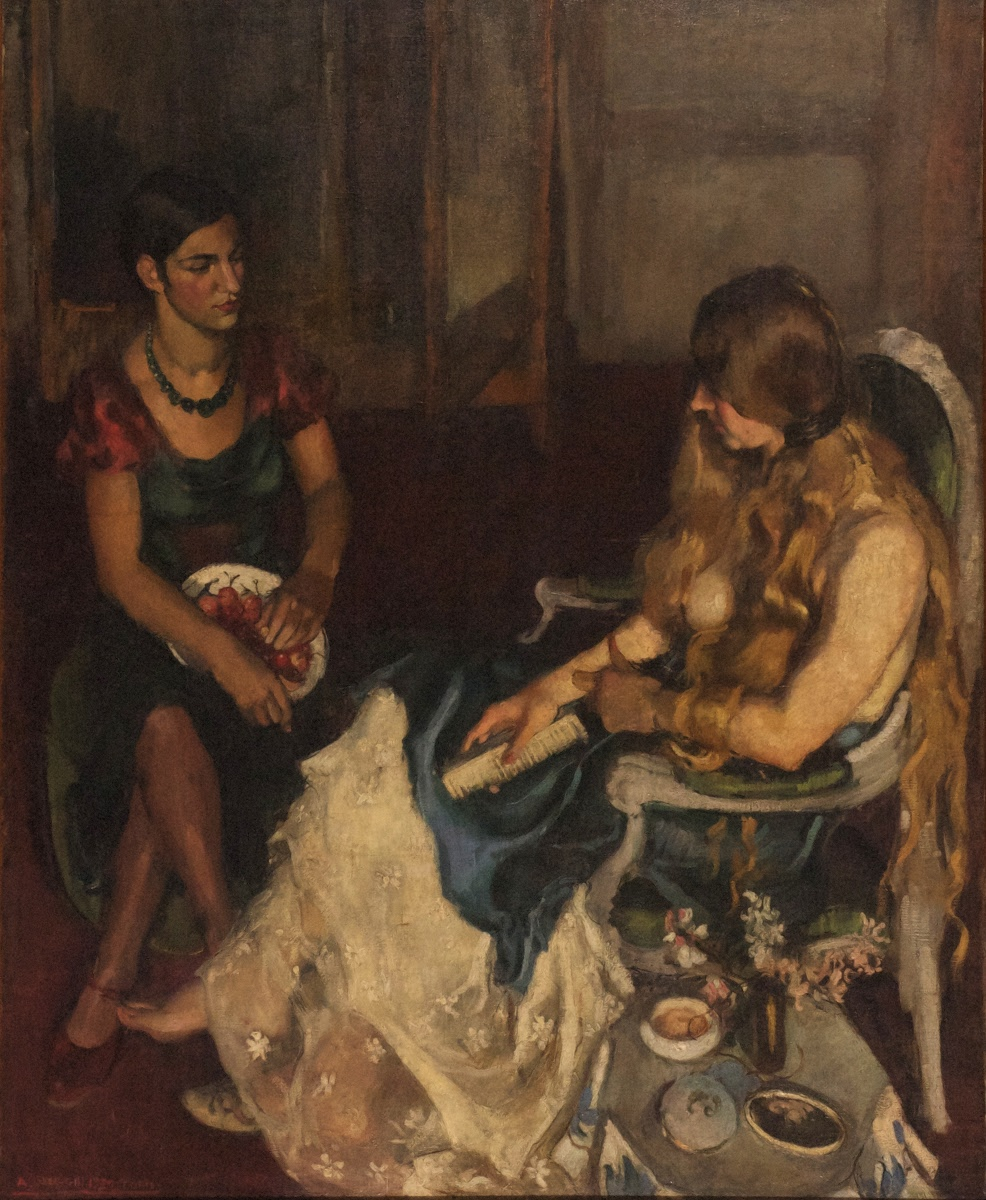
Young Girls (1932)

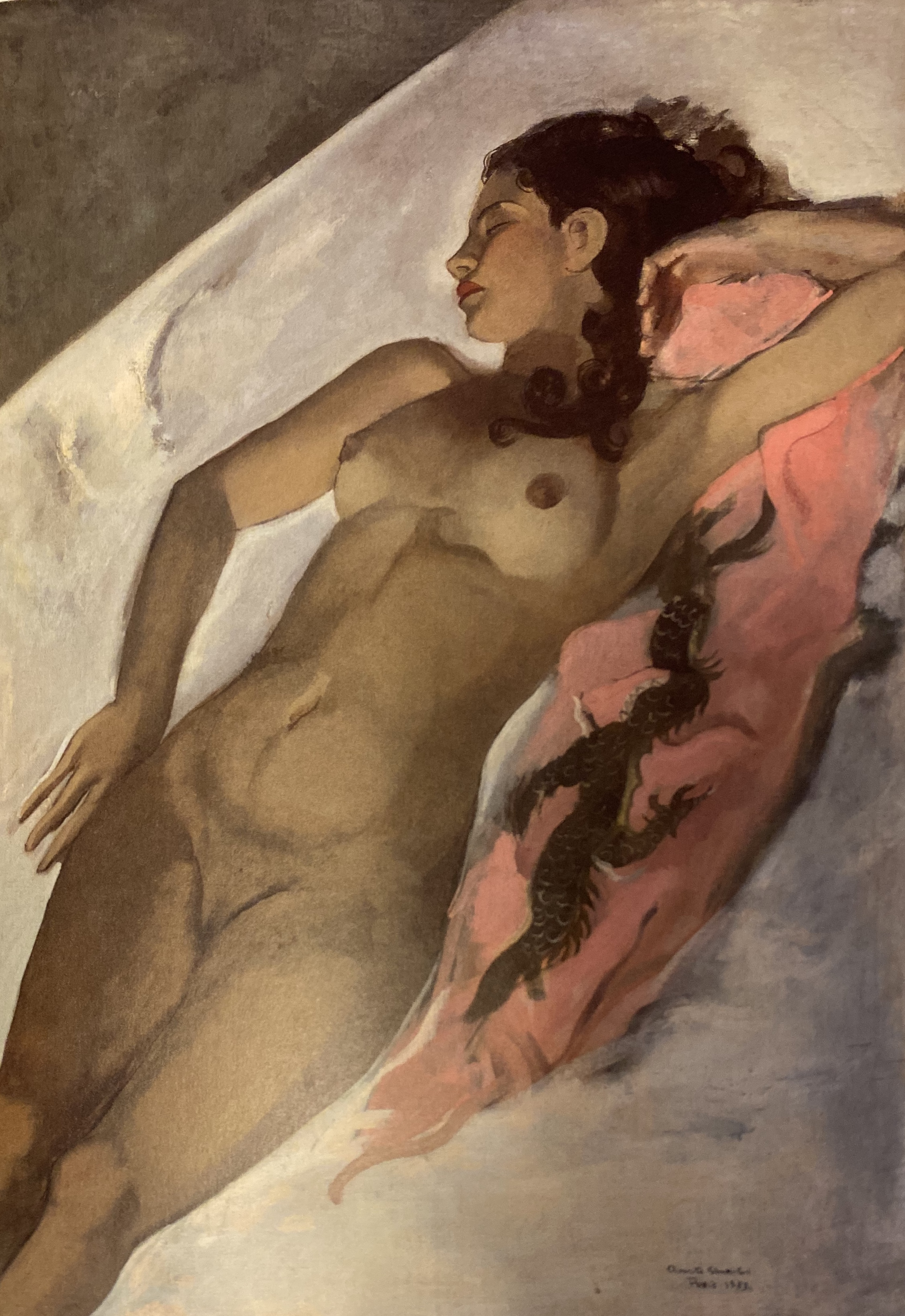
Sleep (1932)

== Bibliography ==
- Dalmia, Yashodhara (2013). Amrita Sher-Gil: A Life. Gurugram: Penguin Books. ISBN 978-0-14-342026-2.
- Sundaram, Vivan (2010). Amrita Sher-Gil: A Self-Portrait in Letters and Writings. Vol. 1. New Delhi: Tulika Books. pp. 1–417. ISBN 978-81-89487-59-1.
- Sundaram, Vivan (2010). Amrita Sher-Gil: A Self-Portrait in Letters and Writings. Vol. 2. New Delhi: Tulika Books. pp. 418–821. ISBN 978-81-89487-59-1.
