= S. P. Sen Verma =

Indian civil servant

S. P. Sen-Varma

3rd Chief Election Commissioner of India
- In office 1 October 1967 – 30 September 1972
- Preceded by: Kalyan Sundaram
- Succeeded by: Nagendra Singh

S.P. Sen-Varma, was a former Chief Election Commissioner of India serving from 1 October 1967 to 30 September 1972.
