= Vivan Sundaram =

Indian artist (1943–2023)

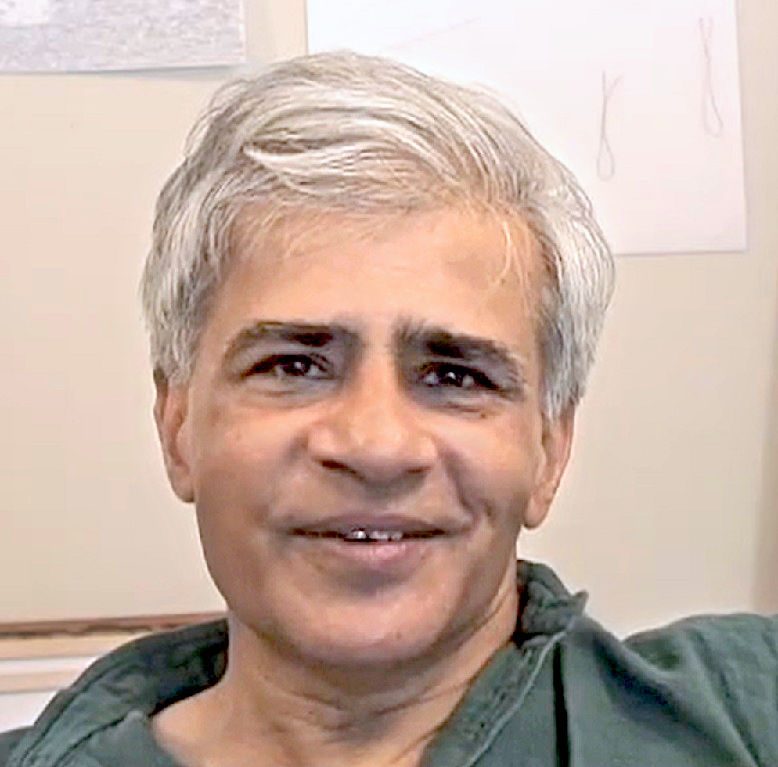
- Sundaram in 2012
- Born: 28 May 1943; Simla, Simla Hill States, British Raj
- Died: 29 March 2023 (aged 79); New Delhi, India
- Education: The Doon School; Maharaja Sayajirao University of Baroda; Slade School of Fine Art, London
- Spouse: Geeta Kapur
- Parent(s): Indira Sundaram and Kalyan Sundaram

Vivan Sundaram (28 May 1943 – 29 March 2023) was an Indian contemporary artist. He worked in many different media, including painting, sculpture, printmaking, photography, installation, and video art, and his work was politically conscious and highly intertextual in nature. His work constantly referred to social problems, popular culture, problems of perception, memory, identification and history. He was married to art historian and critic Geeta Kapur.

== Early life and education ==
Vivan Sundaram was born in Simla, Simla Hill States, British Raj in 1943. His parents were Kalyan Sundaram, Chairman of Law Commission of India from 1968 to 1971, and Indira Sher-Gil, sister of noted Hungarian-Jewish Indian modern artist Amrita Sher-Gil. His grandfather Umrao Singh Sher-Gil is considered one of the pioneers of photography in India.

Sundaram was educated at The Doon School, where he was briefly tutored by Doon's first art teacher and the Bengal School of Art painter, Sudhir Khastgir. He then went to the Faculty of Fine Arts, Maharaja Sayajirao University of Baroda, and at Slade School of London (1966–68) where he also studied history of cinema. He was active in the students’ movement of May 1968. He helped set up a commune in London where he lived till 1970. On his return to India in 1971, he worked with artists’ and students’ groups to organize events and protests, especially during the Emergency years. In London he met the British-American painter R. B. Kitaj, under whom he trained for some time.

== Work ==
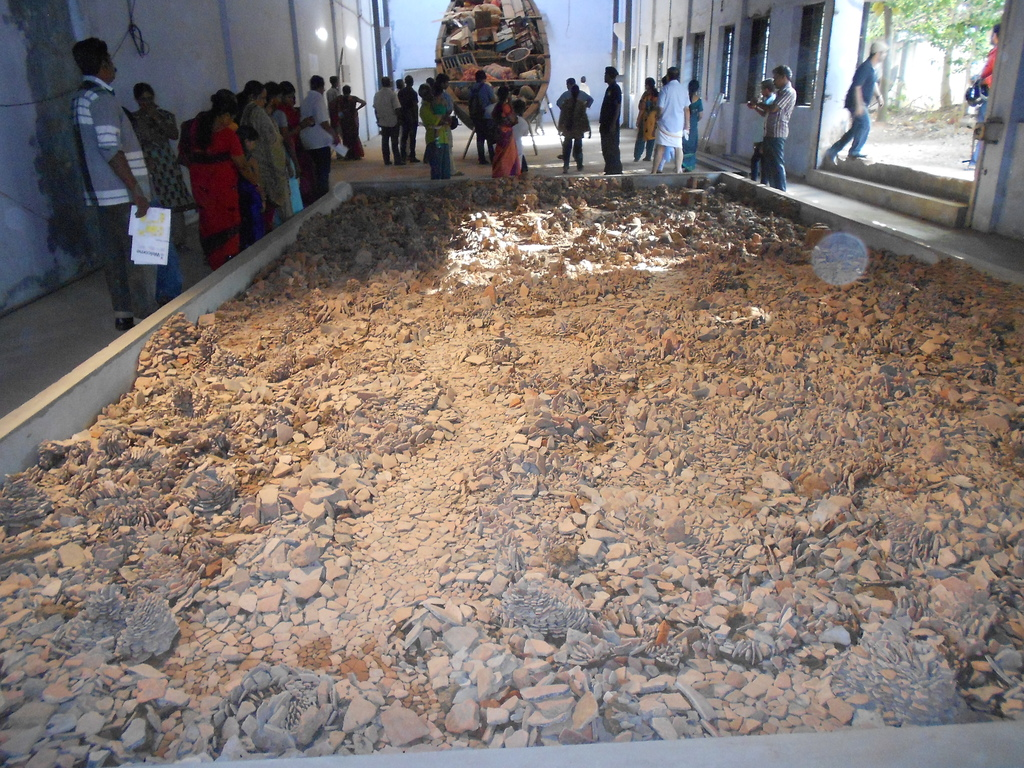
People watching an installation named Black Gold done by Vivan for Kochi-Muziris Biennale

Sundaram worked in many different media, including painting, sculpture, printmaking, photography, installation, and video art, and his work was politically conscious and highly intertextual in nature. His works in the 1980s showed a tendency towards figurative representations, and dealt with problems of identity. His works constantly refer to social problems, popular culture, problems of perception, memory, and history. He was among the first Indian artists to work with installation. His later installations and videos often refer to his artistic influences, among them are Dadaism, Surrealism, as well as latterly Fluxus and the works of Joseph Beuys.

Re-take of ‘Amrita’ is a series of black and white digital photomontages based on archival photographs from the Sher-Gil family. The original photographer was Sundaram's grandfather Umrao Singh. Sundaram reconfigured the photographs and recast the family in new roles, retelling family history. Memorial (1993, 2014), made in response to communal violence in Bombay; a monumental site-specific installation at the Victoria Memorial, Calcutta, now published as the book History Project (1998); continuing work on his family, which includes the installation, The Sher-Gil Archive (1995), and digital photomontages, Re-take of ‘Amrita’ (2001–06), based on photographs taken by Umrao Singh Sher-Gil. A series of exhibitions using found objects include Trash (2008), an installed urbanscape of garbage, digital photomontages and three videos: Tracking (2003–04), The Brief Ascent of Marian Hussain (2005) and Turning (2008). Garbage and found materials were used to make garments, and the work crossed over into fashion and performance in GAGAWAKA: Making Strange (2011) and Postmortem (2013). In 2012, Black Gold, an installation of potsherds from the excavation of Pattanam/Muziris in Kerala, was made into a three-channel video. A project on the artist Ramkinkar Baij, 409 Ramkinkars, was co-authored with theatre directors Anuradha Kapur and Santanu Bose in 2015. In 2017, a public art project on the uprising of the Royal Indian Navy and Bombay’s working class, titled Meanings of Failed Action: Insurrection 1946, was co-authored with cultural theorist Ashish Rajadhyaksha and sound artist David Chapman. A 50-year retrospective exhibition, ‘Step inside and you are no longer a stranger’, invited by the Kiran Nadar Museum of Art in New Delhi, showed from February to June 2018. A solo survey exhibition titled ‘Disjunctures’, invited by Okwui Enwezor and curated by Deepak Anant, showed at Haus der Kunst in Munich, from June 2018 to January 2019. Most recently, Vivan Sundaram was one of 30 artists specially commissioned to make new work to mark the Sharjah Biennial’s 30th anniversary edition. The ongoing Sharjah Biennial 15: Thinking Historically in the Present (February to June 2023), conceived by Okwui Enwezor and curated by Hoor Al Qasimi, includes Sundaram’s photography-based project, Six Stations of a Life Pursued (2022). In 2016, Sundaram set up the Sher-Gil Sundaram Arts Foundation (SSAF) with his sister, the filmmaker and television journalist Navina Sundaram.

== Death ==
Sundaram died following a brief illness in New Delhi, on 29 March 2023, at the age of 79. He was married to art historian and critic Geeta Kapur.
