= Kuttur =

Kuttur may refer to:

- Kuttur (Kannur), a village in Kannur District, Kerala, India
- Kuttur (Kodagu), a village in Kodagu District, Karnataka, India
- Kuttur (Thrissur), a town in Thrissur District, Kerala, India

== See also ==
- Kuttur Mallappa, an Indian legislator
- Kuttura, a village in Finland
- Kuttoor (Pathanamthitta), a village in Pathanamthitta District, Kerala, India
