= Ervin Baktay =

Hungarian author (1890–1963)

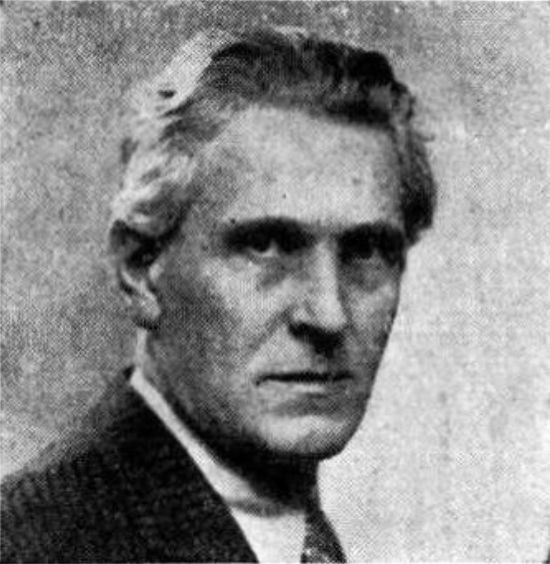
- Born: Ervin Gottesmann; 1890
- Died: 1963 (aged 72–73)
- Occupations: Writer, painter
- Relatives: Amrita Sher-Gil (niece); Umrao Singh Sher-Gil (brother-in-law)
- Writing career
- Subject: Indology

Ervin Baktay (1890–1963; born Ervin Gottesmann) was an author noted for popularizing Indian culture in Hungary.

Baktay had started his career as a painter and he encouraged his niece Amrita Sher-Gil to pursue art. He gave up painting to study eastern religions and art, and became a renowned Indologist.

== Early life ==
Ervin Baktay was born on 24 June 1890 in Dunaharaszti, on the Pest side of Budapest. He was the youngest of five children of Raoul Gottesmann and his wife Antononia Levys-Martonfalvy. Following the death of his father in 1905, Baktay's mother decided to move to Austria and then to Zebegény, Hungary, at the onset of the First World War. He studied painting with Simon Hollósy in Munich. Later, in 1927, he made his first journey to India.

He was uncle to artist Amrita Sher-Gil and nephew to Nagybánya artist Alfréd Gottesmann (1872–1965).

== Works ==
Baktay translated the Kama Sutra in 1920 and then published a version of the Mahābhārata in 1923. In 1960, he produced a version of the Ramayana. His major work, History of Indian Art, was published in 1963.

== Death ==
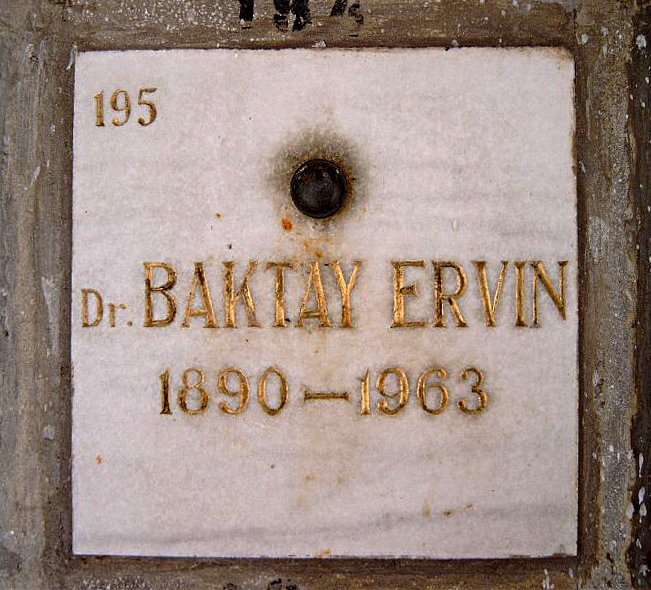
Dr. Ervin Baktay's tomb at Farkasréti Cemetery

Baktay died in 1963.

== Selected publications ==
- Baktay Ervin: Die Kunst Indiens; Übers. Edith Róth; Bearb. Heinz Kucharski; Berlin - Budapest, Terra - Akad. Verlag, 1963.

== Bibliography ==
- Dalmia, Yashodhara (2013). Amrita Sher-Gil: A Life. Gurugram: Penguin Books. ISBN 978-0-14-342026-2.
- Sundaram, Vivan (2010). Amrita Sher-Gil: A Self-Portrait in Letters and Writings. Vol. 1. New Delhi: Tulika Books. pp. 1–417. ISBN 978-81-89487-59-1.
- Sundaram, Vivan (2010). Amrita Sher-Gil: A Self-Portrait in Letters and Writings. Vol. 2. New Delhi: Tulika Books. pp. 418–821. ISBN 978-81-89487-59-1.
