= Umrao Singh Sher-Gil =

Indian philosopher photographer (1870 – 1954)

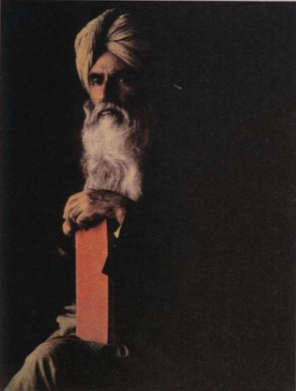
- Sher-Gil (self portrait, Shimla, 1924)
- Born: 1870; Majitha, Punjab, British India
- Died: 1954 (aged 84); New Delhi, India
- Occupations: Photographer and visual artist
- Known for: Mise-en-scène portraits
- Spouse: Narninder Kaur (m. 1883; died 1907) Marie Antoinette Gottesman (m. 1912; died 1948)
- Children: 6 (including Amrita and Indira)
- Father: Surat Singh
- Relatives: Sundar Singh (brother)

Umrao Singh Sher-Gil Majithia (1870–1954) was an Indian aristocrat, scholar of Sanskrit and philosophy, and photographer. He was known as one of the pioneers of photography in India, leaving behind over 3,000 prints, including the hundreds of family portraits and over 80 self-portraits staged in a mise-en-scène style.

His daughters included the artist Amrita Sher-Gil and Indira Sundaram. In India, a photography grant named after him was instituted in 2015.

== Early life ==
Gil was born in 1870 to Surat Singh of Majitha, near Amritsar in then British India. He completed his early education in Amritsar and later studied at the Aitchison College in Lahore (in then undivided Punjab). His younger brother Sundar Singh was an industrialist and a politician, who was later knighted by the then British Indian government. Gil was 11 when his father died in 1881. Having inherited the title as the head of the Majitha family, he travelled to England in 1896, and again in 1897 to attend the Diamond Jubilee of Queen Victoria. He also attended the Delhi Darbar in 1903 and in 1911.

Gil was a scholar of Persian and Sanskrit. He was associated with the Indian independence movement and was noted to have had links with the Gadar party, a revolutionary movement in the country, around 1915. When these links were identified his land holdings were confiscated by the then government. He was an admirer of Russian author and activist, Leo Tolstoy, after whom he modelled his approach to humanism and even his looks. He was also a friend of the poet Muhammad Iqbal.

== Works ==
Gil was one of the pioneers of photography in India, when he began photography in the early 1890s. After his marriage to the Hungarian opera singer, Marie Antoinette Gottesman-Baktay, the subjects of his photographic works were largely his family – his wife and two daughters, and his own self portraits. He experimented with some of the then latest techniques including autochrome prints and stereoscope cameras. He produced hundreds of photographs of his family which were intentionally staged mise-en-scène, a format that he pioneered, with his home as the backdrop. Many of his works could be categorised as performative photography. His own self-portraits and the portraits of his family were noted for their residual sadness which further increased after the death of his daughter Amrita Sher-Gil in 1941 and the death of his wife in 1948.

Gil experimented with various toning methods and left behind over 3,000 prints and negatives, including over 80 self-portraits, chronicling life across Europe and India in the early part of the twentieth century. Gil documented the family's life in Europe extensively through his photography and continued to do so after the family's return to India. These works spanned Paris, Budapest, Shimla, and Lahore, and presented a view into an aristocratic-bourgeois life across continents. His works were noted to have presented his family and himself as a "modern proto-postcolonial subject". His photographs have been posthumously exhibited in Canada, France, Spain, and UK, in addition to India.

Gil was a scholar of Sanskrit, and one of his works include a manuscript on Pāṇinīyaśikṣā, a treatise of Sanskrit phonetics which is attributed to Pāṇini and Pingalacharya. The manuscript was published by the Bibliothèque nationale de France in 1930 in Paris, where he had then relocated his family for his daughters to study in the city. A letter that he wrote to Hungarian scholar, Ignác Goldziher, which is now held at the Hungarian Academy of Sciences, shows his engagement with prominent scholars of the time. Gil was considered a reclusive, but he maintained detailed diaries and records of letters, some of which have him writing about his written manuscripts of philosophical scriptures including the Mandukya Upanishad, both for his self-study and for his friends readings. In one of these notes, he wrote that despite his multiple readings it remains "unfathomable like an ocean of truth, which it is".

A photography grant named after him was instituted by his family in 2015. In addition to photography and philosophy, Gil had varied interests including astronomy, carpentry, calligraphy, and yoga. An article in The New York Times many years after his death, called him "an eccentric polymath with a fondness for (and a startling resemblance to) Tolstoy".

== Gallery ==
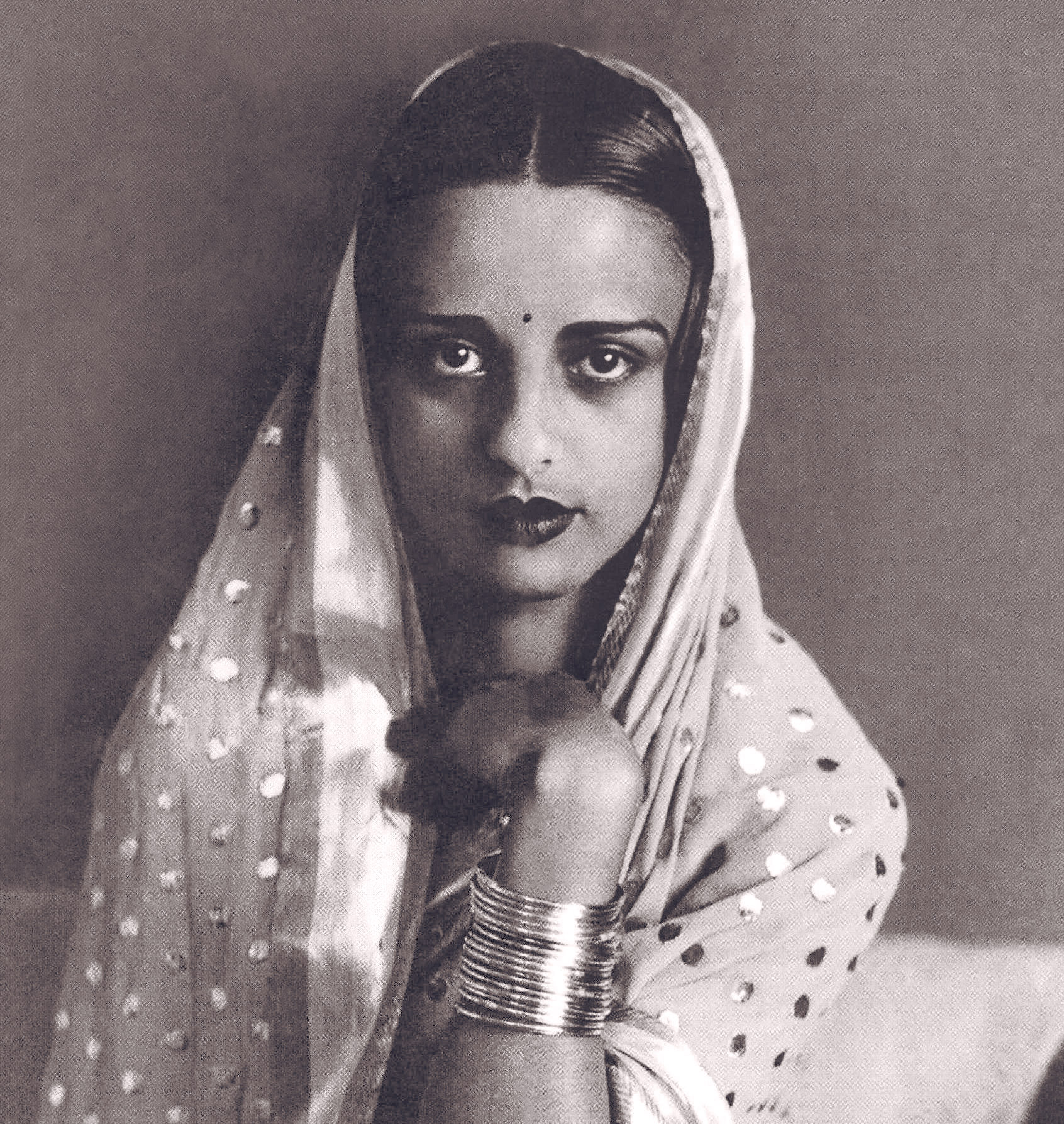
Daughter Amrita Sher-Gil (1936)

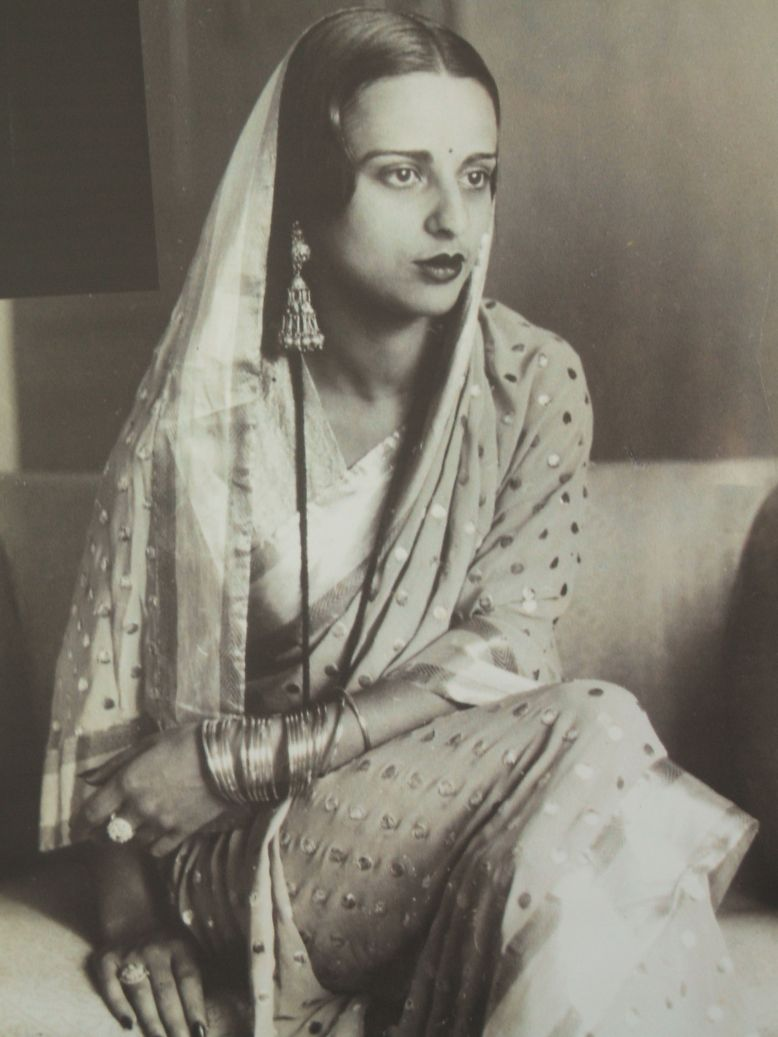
Daughter Amrita Sher-Gil (1936)

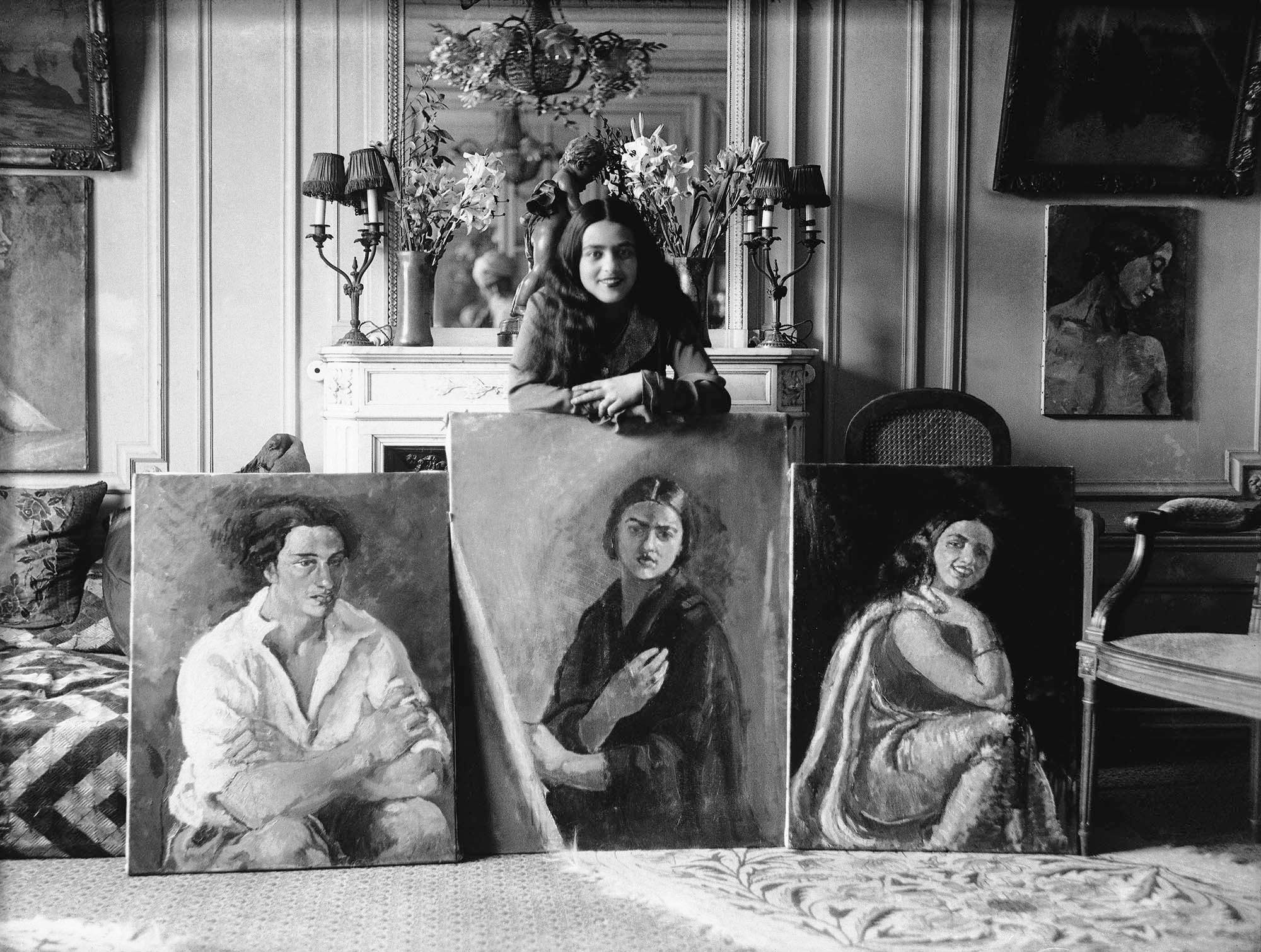
Daughter Amrita Sher-Gil with her paintings (year unknown)

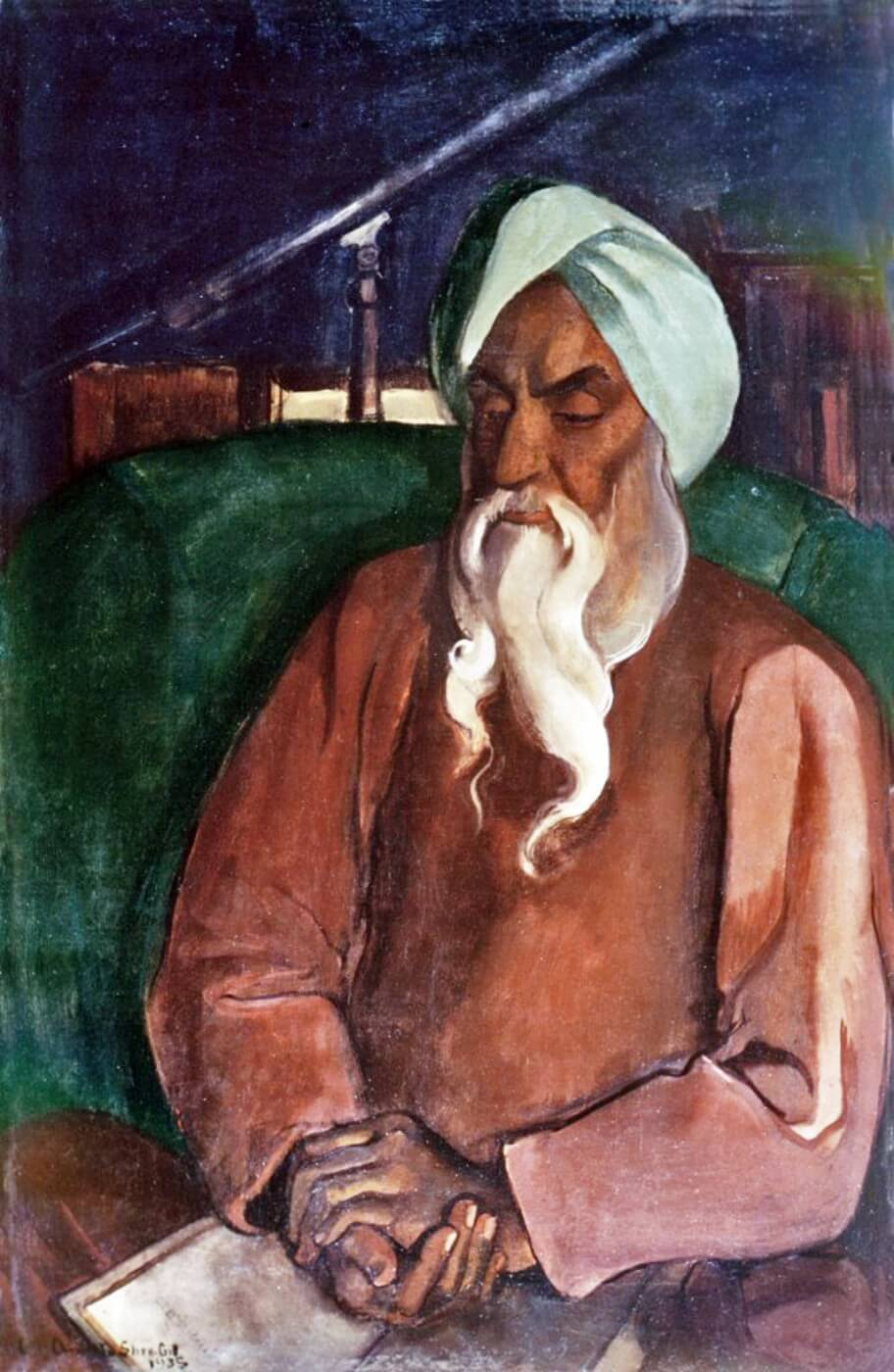
Portrait of SherGil in Simla by his daughter (1935)

== Personal life ==
Gil married his first wife Narninder Kaur (1870s-1907) at the age of 13. They had three sons and a daughter; Balram, Satyavan (Vani), Vivek (Bikki), Prakash Kaur (Praki). Kaur died in 1907.

Gil met Marie Antoinette Gottesman-Baktay, a Hungarian opera singer in 1911, when she was visiting Punjab accompanying Princess Bamba Sutherland. The couple married in 1912. He moved with her to Hungary before the First World War, where they had two daughters Amrita Sher-Gil, who would later go on to become a visual artist, and Indira Sundaram (née Sher-Gil), both of whom were extensive subjects of his photographic works. The family lived in Hungary through the First World War, and then returned in 1921 to India, where they lived in Shimla. The family returned to Europe in 1929 moving to France, living in Paris, where both his daughters studied. The family returned to India in 1934.

Gil died in 1954 at his daughter's home in New Delhi. He was aged 84. His wife had predeceased him in 1948, dying by suicide.

== Book(s) ==
- Sher-Gil, Umrao Singh; Sundaram, Vivan; Ananth, Deepak (2008). Umrao Singh Sher-Gil: His Misery and His Manuscript. Photoink. ISBN 978-81-903911-1-5.
- Jhaveri, Shanay (2016). The Journey in My Head: Cosmopolitanism and Indian Male Self-portraiture in 20th Century India : Umrao Singh Sher-Gil, Bhupen Khakhar, Ragubhir Singh. Royal College of Art.

== Bibliography ==
- Sundaram, Vivan (2010). Amrita Sher-Gil: A Self-Portrait in Letters and Writings. Vol. 1. New Delhi: Tulika Books. pp. 1–417. ISBN 978-81-89487-59-1.
- Sundaram, Vivan (2010). Amrita Sher-Gil: A Self-Portrait in Letters and Writings. Vol. 2. New Delhi: Tulika Books. pp. 418–821. ISBN 978-81-89487-59-1.
- Dalmia, Yashodhara (2013). Amrita Sher-Gil: A Life. Gurugram: Penguin Books. ISBN 978-0-14-342026-2.
