= Amrita Sher-Gil =

Hungarian-Indian painter (1913–1941)

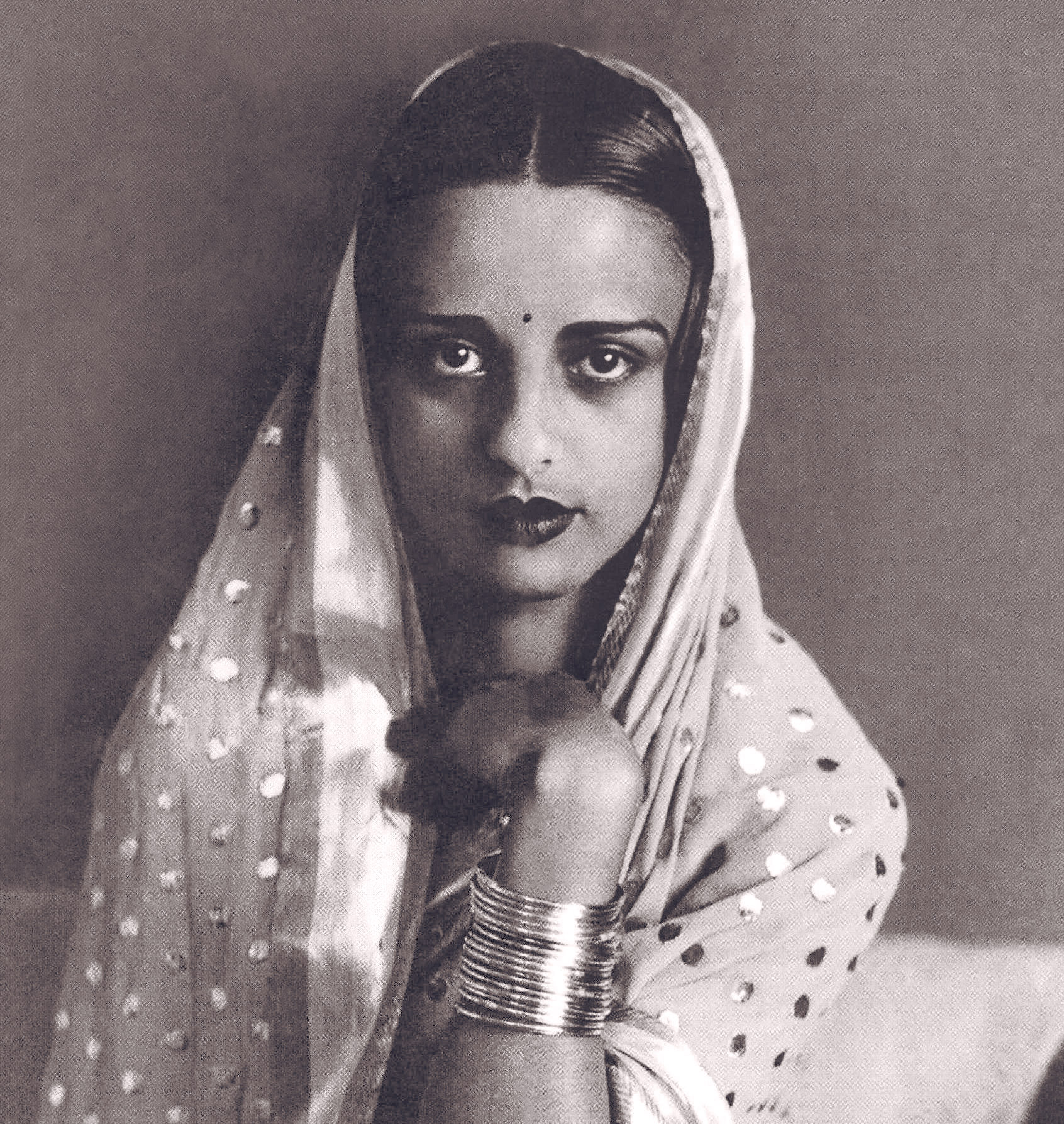
- Sher-Gil in 1936
- Born: 30 January 1913; Budapest, Hungary, Austria-Hungary
- Died: 5 December 1941 (aged 28); Lahore, Punjab, British India
- Education: Grande Chaumière; École des Beaux-Arts (1930–1934)
- Known for: Painting
- Spouse: Viktor Egan (m. 1938)

Amrita Sher-Gil (30 January 1913 – 5 December 1941) was a Hungarian–Indian painter. She has been called "one of the greatest avant-garde women artists of the early 20th century" and a pioneer in modern Indian art. Drawn to painting from an early age, Sher-Gil started formal lessons at the age of eight. She first gained recognition at the age of 19, for her 1932 oil painting Young Girls. Sher-Gil depicted everyday life of the people in her paintings.

Sher-Gil travelled throughout her life to various countries including Turkey, France, and India, deriving heavily from precolonial Indian art styles as well as contemporary culture. Sher-Gil is considered an important painter of 20th-century India, whose legacy stands on a level with that of the pioneers from the Bengal Renaissance. She was also an avid reader and a pianist. Sher-Gil's paintings are among the most expensive by Indian women painters today, although few acknowledged her work when she was alive.

== Early life and education ==
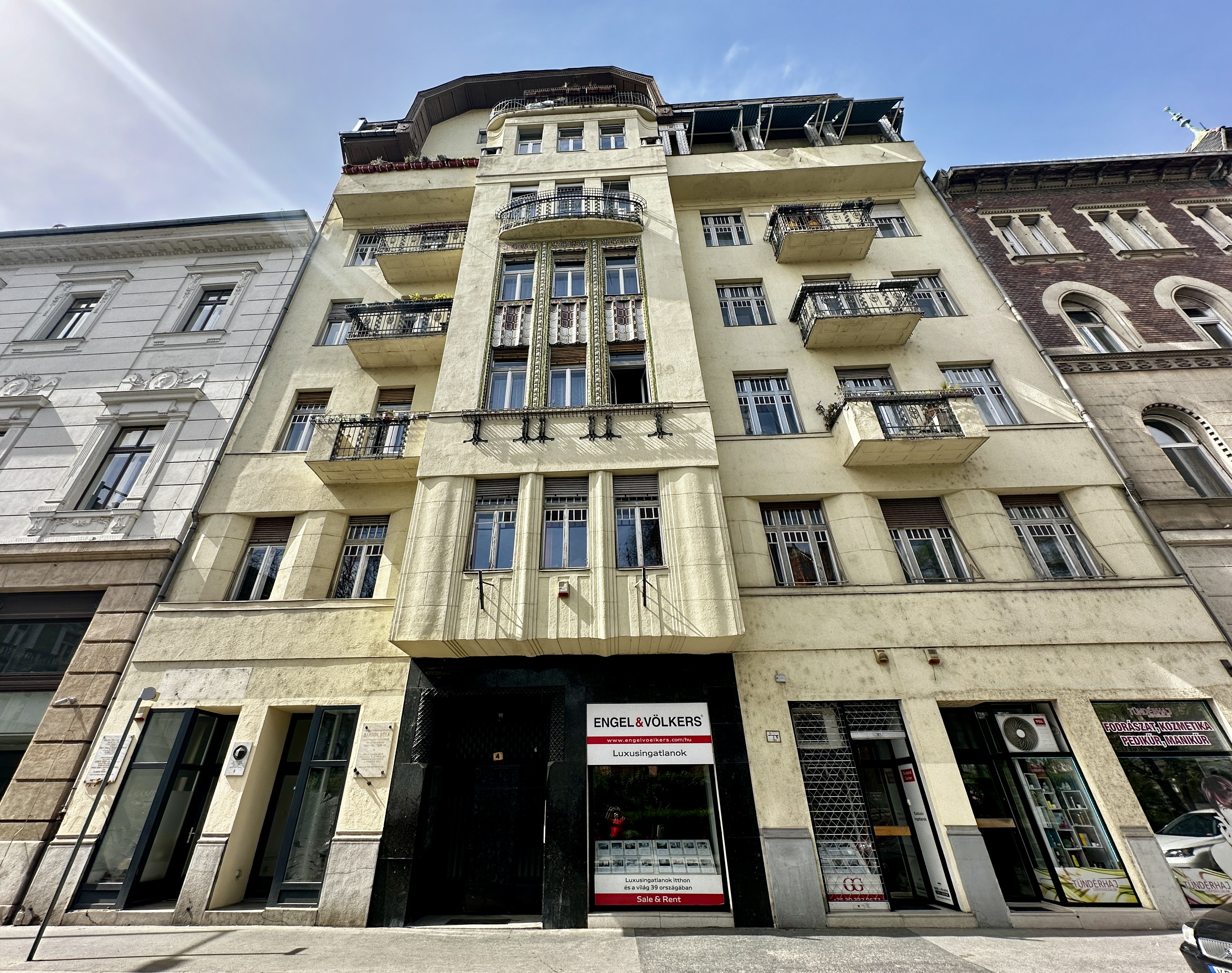
Sher-Gil's birthplace, 4 Szilágyi Dezső square, Budapest

Amrita Sher-Gil was born Dalma-Amrita on 30 January 1913, at 4 Szilágyi Dezső square, Budapest, then part of the Austro-Hungarian Empire. Her father was Umrao Singh Sher-Gil Majithia, a Punjabi Indian Jat Sikh aristocrat from the Majithia Shergill family and a scholar in Sanskrit and Persian, and her mother was Marie Antoinette Gottesman, a Hungarian-Jewish opera singer who came from an affluent bourgeois family. Her parents first met in 1912, while Marie Antoinette was visiting Lahore. Her mother came to India as a companion of Princess Bamba Sutherland, the granddaughter of Maharaja Ranjit Singh. Sher-Gil was the elder of two daughters; her younger sister was Indira Sundaram (née Sher-Gil; born in March 1914), mother of the contemporary artist Vivan Sundaram. The family were obliged to remain in Budapest until after the First World War.

Her family faced financial problems in Hungary. In 1921, her family moved to Summer Hill in Shimla, India, and Sher-Gil soon began learning piano and violin. By age nine she, along with her younger sister Indira, was giving concerts and acting in plays at Shimla's Gaiety Theatre. Though she had already been painting since the age of five, she started studying painting formally at age eight. Sher-Gil received formal lessons in art from Major Whitmarsh, who was later replaced by Hal Bevan-Petman. In Shimla, Sher-Gil lived a relatively privileged lifestyle. As a child, she was expelled from her Catholic school Convent of Jesus and Mary for declaring herself an atheist.

In 1923, Marie came to know an Italian sculptor, who was living in Shimla at the time. In 1924, when he returned to Italy, she too moved there, along with Amrita, and got her enrolled at Santa Annunziata, an art school in Florence. Though Amrita did not stay at this school for long and returned to India in 1924, it was here that she was exposed to works of Italian masters.

She was the niece of Indologist Ervin Baktay. Baktay noticed Sher-Gil's artistic talents during his visit to Shimla in 1926 and was an advocate of Sher-Gil pursuing art. He guided her by critiquing her work and gave her an academic foundation to grow on. When she was a young girl she would paint the servants in her house, and get them to model for her. The memories of these models would eventually lead to her return to India.

At sixteen, Sher-Gil sailed to Europe with her mother to train as a painter in Paris, first at the Académie de la Grande Chaumière under Pierre Vaillent and Lucien Simon (where she met Boris Taslitzky) and later at the École des Beaux-Arts (1930–1934). She drew inspiration from European painters such as Paul Cézanne, Paul Gauguin and Amedeo Modigliani, while working under the influence of her teacher Lucien Simon and through the company of artist friends and lovers like Taslitzky. While in Paris, she is said to have painted with a conviction and maturity rarely seen in a 16-year old.

In 1931, Sher-Gil was briefly engaged to Yusuf Ali Khan, but rumours spread that she was also having an affair with her first cousin and later husband Viktor Egan. Her letters reveal same-sex affairs.

== Career ==
=== 1932–1936: Early career, European and Western styles ===
Young Girls, 1932, oil on canvas, 133×164 cm, National Gallery of Modern Art, Delhi

Sher-Gil's early paintings display a significant influence of the Western modes of painting, more specifically, the Post-Impressionism style. She practised a lot in the Bohemian circles of Paris in the early 1930s. Her 1932 oil painting, Young Girls, came as a breakthrough for her; the work won her accolades, including a gold medal and election as an Associate of the Grand Salon in Paris in 1933. She was the youngest ever member, and the only Asian to have received this recognition. Her work during this time includes a number of self-portraits, as well as life in Paris, nude studies, still life studies, and portraits of friends and fellow students. The National Gallery of Modern Art in New Delhi describes the self-portraits she made while in Paris as "[capturing] the artist in her many moods – somber, pensive, and joyous – while revealing a narcissistic streak in her personality".

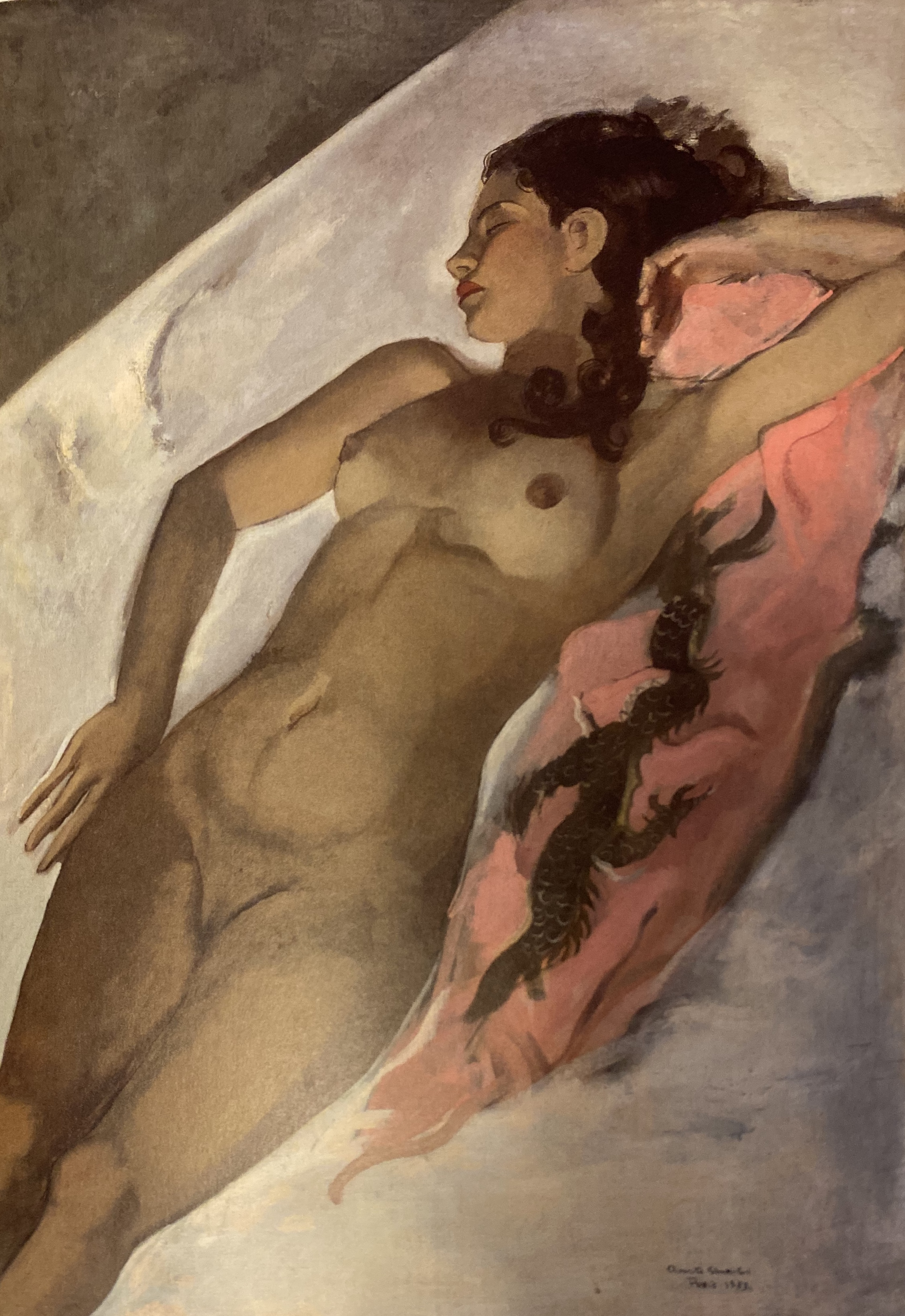
Sleep, 1932, oil on canvas 112.5 × 79 cm, National Gallery of Modern Art, Delhi

When she was in Paris, one of her professors said that judging by the richness of her colouring Sher-Gil was not in her element in the west, and that her artistic personality would find its true atmosphere in the east. In 1933, Sher-Gil "began to be haunted by an intense longing to return to India feeling in some strange way that there lay her destiny as a painter". She returned to India at the end of 1934. In May 1935, Sher-Gil met the English journalist Malcolm Muggeridge, then working as assistant editor and leader writer for The Calcutta Statesman. Both Muggeridge and Sher-Gil stayed at the family home at Summer Hill, Shimla and a short intense affair took place during which she painted a casual portrait of her new lover, the painting now with the National Gallery of Modern Art in New Delhi. By September 1935 Amrita saw Muggeridge off as he travelled back to England for new employment. She left herself for travel in 1936 at the behest of art collector and critic Karl Khandalavala, who encouraged her to pursue her passion for discovering her Indian roots. In India, she began a quest for the rediscovery of the traditions of Indian art which was to continue till her death. She was greatly impressed and influenced by the Mughal and Pahari schools of painting and the cave paintings at Ajanta.

South Indian Villagers going to Market, 1937.

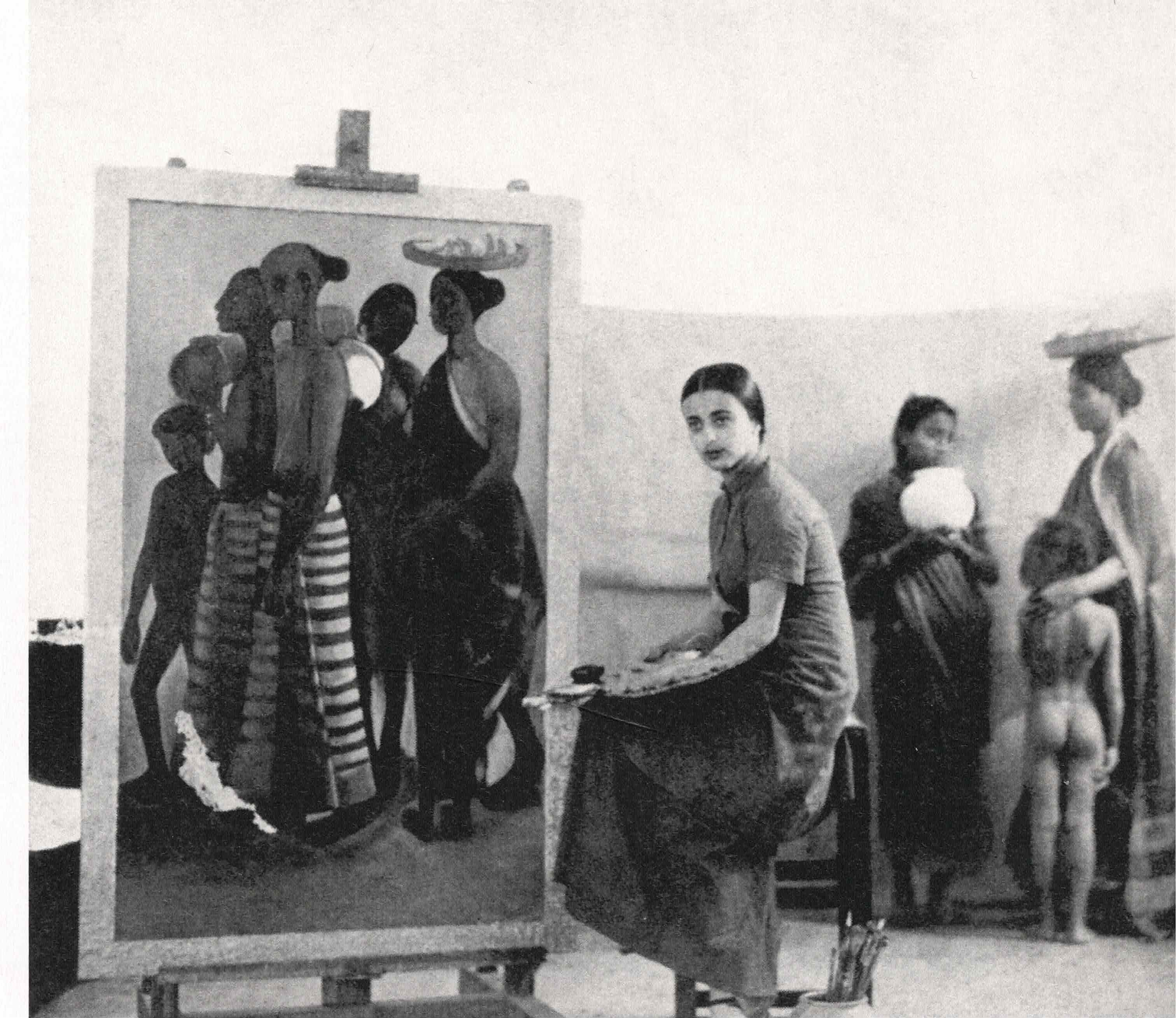
Sher-Gil painting South Indian Villagers going to Market with three of its models, photographed in 1937 at her home in Simla.

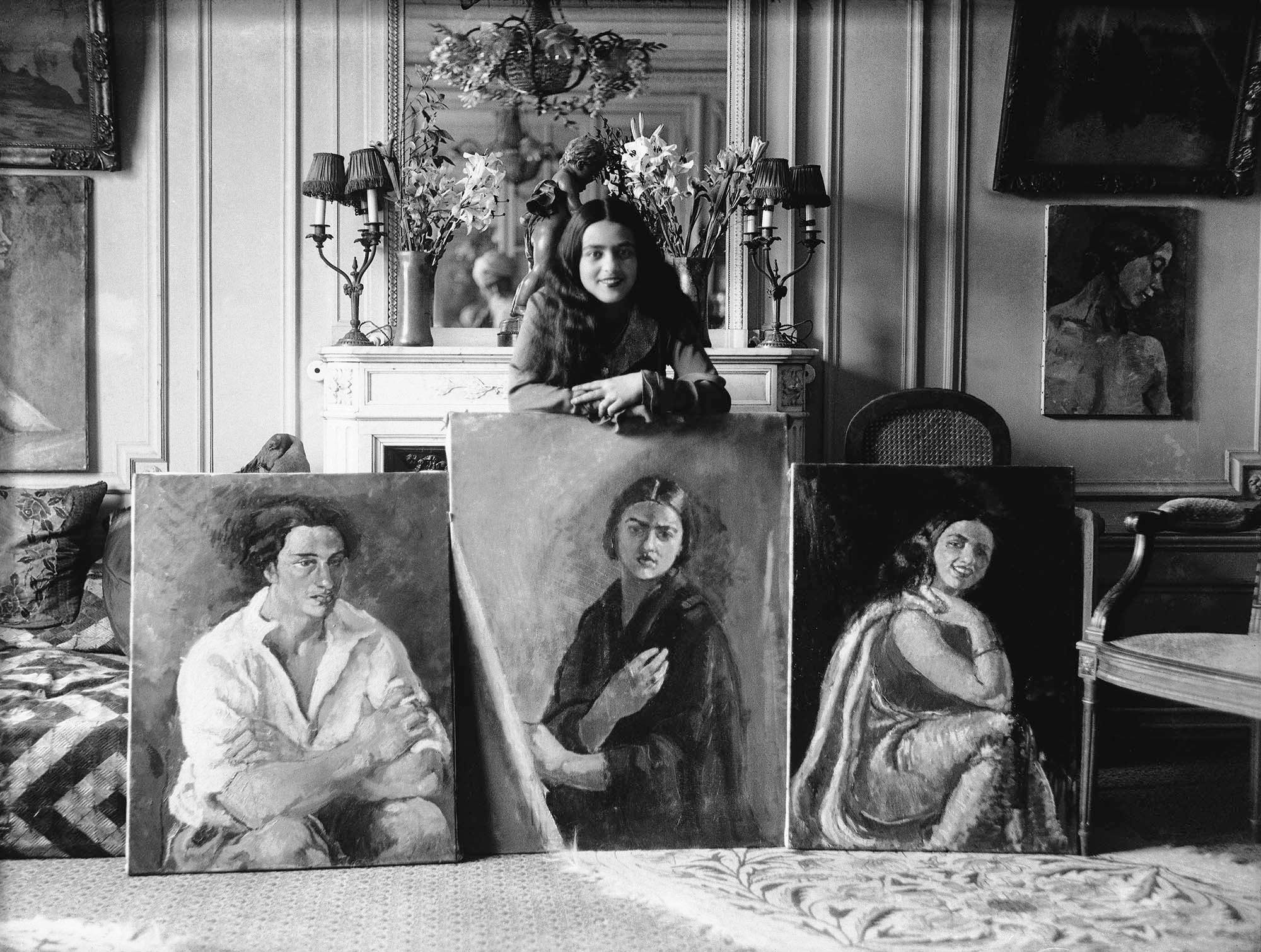
Sher-Gil with three of her paintings in Paris

=== 1937–1941: Later career, influence of Indian art ===
Later in 1937, Sher-Gil toured South India and produced her South Indian trilogy of paintings Bride's Toilet, Brahmacharis, and South Indian Villagers Going to Market following her visit to the Ajanta Caves, when she made a conscious attempt to return to classical Indian art. These paintings reveal her passionate sense of colour and empathy for her Indian subjects, who are often depicted in their poverty and despair. By now the transformation in her work was complete and she had found her 'artistic mission' which was, according to her, to express the life of Indian people through her canvas. While in Saraya, Sher-Gil wrote to a friend: "I can only paint in India. Europe belongs to Picasso, Matisse, Braque.... India belongs only to me." Her stay in India marks the beginning of a new phase in her artistic development, one that was distinct from the European phase of the interwar years when her work showed an engagement with the works of Hungarian painters, especially the Nagybánya school of painting.

Sher-Gil married her Hungarian first cousin, Viktor Egan when she was 25. He had helped Sher-Gil obtain abortions on at least two occasions prior to their marriage. She moved with him to India to stay at her paternal family's home in Saraya, Sardar nagar, Chauri Chaura in Gorakhpur, Uttar Pradesh. Thus began her second phase of painting, whose impact on Indian art rivals that of Rabindranath Tagore and Jamini Roy of the Bengal school of art. The 'Calcutta Group' of artists, which transformed the Indian art scene, was to start only in 1943, and the 'Progressive Artist's Group', with Francis Newton Souza, Ara, Bakre, Gade, M. F. Husain and S. H. Raza among its founders, lay further ahead in 1948. Sher-Gil's art was strongly influenced by the paintings of the two Tagores, Rabindranath and Abanindranath who were pioneers of the Bengal School of painting. Her portraits of women resemble works by Rabindranath while the use of 'chiaroscuro' and bright colours reflect the influence of Abanindranath.

During her stay at Saraya, Sher-Gil painted the Village Scene, In the Ladies' Enclosure, and Siesta, all of which portray the leisurely rhythms of life in rural India. Siesta and In the Ladies' Enclosure reflect her experimentation with the miniature school of painting while Village Scene reflects influences of the Pahari school of painting. Although acclaimed by art critics Karl Khandalavala in Bombay and Charles Fabri in Lahore as the greatest painter of the century, Sher-Gil's paintings found few buyers. She travelled across India with her paintings but the Nawab Salar Jung of Hyderabad returned them and the Maharaja of Mysore chose Raja Ravi Varma's paintings over hers.

Although from a family that was closely tied to the British Raj, Sher-Gil was a Congress sympathiser. She was attracted to the poor, distressed and the deprived and her paintings of Indian villagers and women are a meditative reflection of their condition. She was also attracted by Gandhi's philosophy and lifestyle. Nehru was charmed by her beauty and talent and when he went to Gorakhpur in October 1940, he visited her at Saraya. Her paintings were at one stage even considered for use in the Congress propaganda for village reconstruction. Despite befriending Nehru, she never drew his portrait, supposedly because she thought he was "too good looking". Nehru attended her exhibition held in New Delhi in February 1937. Sher-Gil exchanged letters with Nehru for a time, but those letters were burned by her parents when she was away getting married in Budapest.

In September 1941, Egan and Sher-Gil moved to Lahore, then in undivided India and a major cultural and artistic centre. She lived and painted at 23 Ganga Ram Mansions, The Mall, Lahore where her studio was on the top floor of the townhouse she inhabited. Sher-Gil was known for her many affairs with both men and women, and she also painted many of the latter. Her work Two Women is thought to be a painting of herself and her lover Marie Louise. Some of her later works include Tahitian (1937), Red Brick House (1938), Hill Scene (1938), and The Bride (1940) among others. Her last work was left unfinished just prior to her death in December 1941.

== Illness and death ==
In 1941, at age 28, just days before the opening of her first major solo show in Lahore, Sher-Gil became seriously ill and slipped into a coma. She later died around midnight on 5 December 1941, leaving behind a large volume of work. The cause of her death has never been ascertained. A failed abortion and subsequent peritonitis have been suggested as possible causes for her death. Her mother accused her doctor husband Egan of having murdered her. The day after her death, Britain declared war on Hungary and Egan was interned as an enemy alien. Sher-Gil was cremated on 7 December 1941 in Lahore.

== Artistic and cultural legacies ==
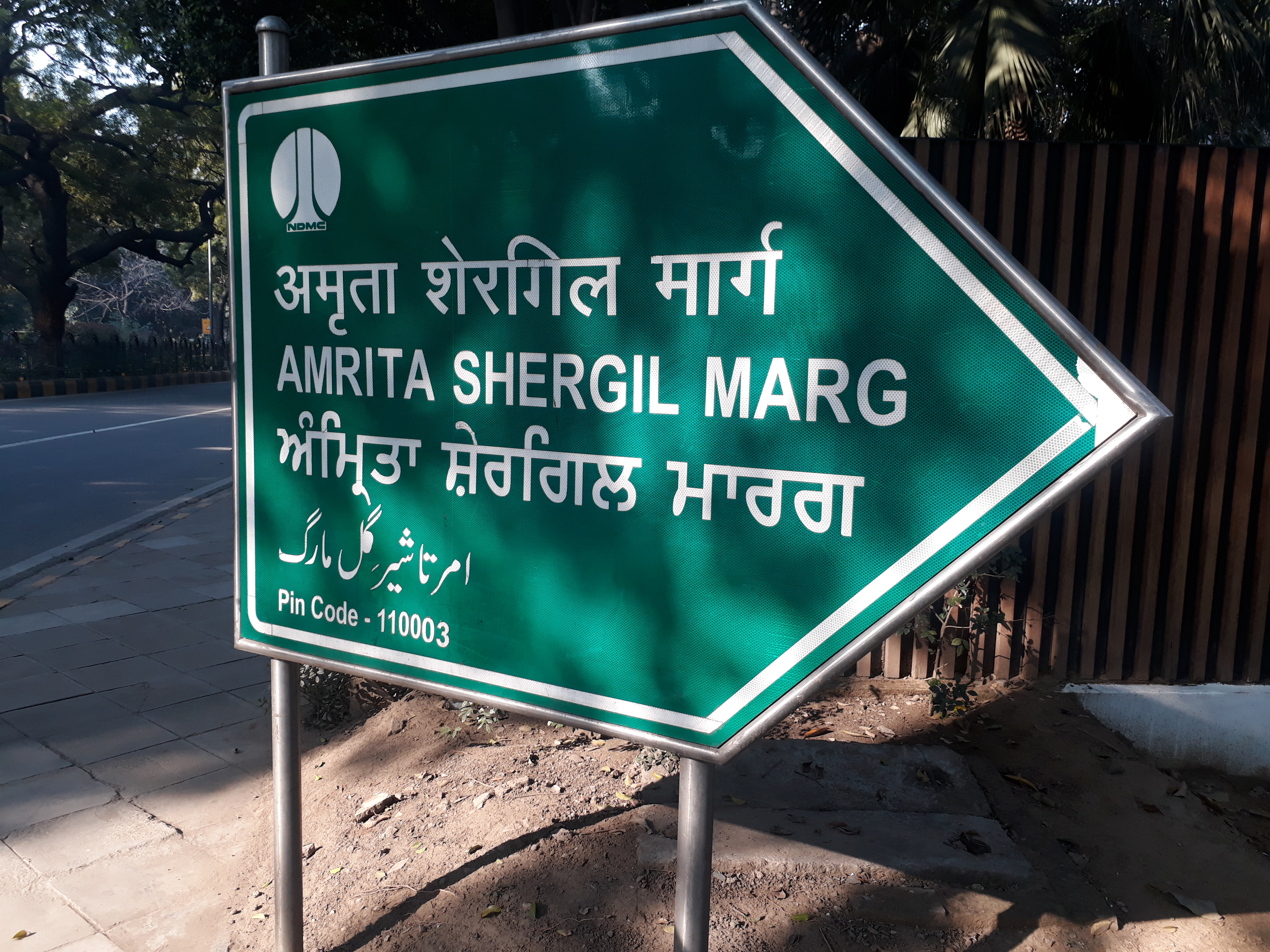
Road named in New Delhi after Sher-Gil

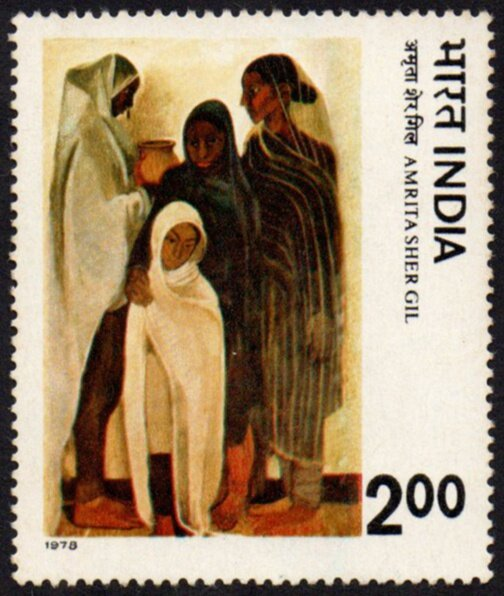
Indian Postage Stamp of Amrita Shergil Painting

Sher-Gil's art has influenced generations of Indian artists from Sayed Haider Raza to Arpita Singh and her depiction of the plight of women has made her art a beacon for women at large both in India and abroad. The Government of India has declared her works as National Art Treasures, and most of them are housed in the National Gallery of Modern Art in New Delhi. Some of her paintings also hang at the Lahore Museum. A postage stamp depicting her painting Hill Women was released in 1978 by India Post, and the Amrita Shergil Marg is a road in Lutyens' Delhi named after her. Sher-Gil was able to prove to western societies that Indians were able to make fine art. Her work is deemed to be so important to Indian culture that when it is sold in India, the Indian government has stipulated that the art must stay in the country – fewer than ten of her works have been sold globally. In 2006, her painting Village Scene sold for ₹6.9 crores at an auction in New Delhi which was at the time the highest amount ever paid for a painting in India.

The Indian cultural centre in Budapest is named the Amrita Sher-Gil Cultural Centre. Contemporary artists in India have recreated and reinterpreted her works.

Amrita Sher-Gil (1969) is a documentary film about the artist, directed by Bhagwan Das Garga and produced by the Government of India's Films Division. It won the National Film Award for Best Non-Feature Film.

Besides remaining an inspiration to many contemporary Indian artists, in 1993 she also became the inspiration behind the Urdu play Tumhari Amrita.

UNESCO announced 2013, the 100th anniversary of Sher-Gil's birth, to be the international year of Amrita Sher-Gil.

Sher-Gil's work is a key theme in the contemporary Indian novel Faking It by Amrita Chowdhury.

Aurora Zogoiby, a character in Salman Rushdie's 1995 novel The Moor's Last Sigh, was inspired by Sher-Gil.

Claire Kohda refers repeatedly to Amrita Sher-Gil and to her painting the Three Girls in her 2022 novel Woman, Eating, which features a British main character of mixed Malaysian and Japanese origin. Struggling with alienation and with living between worlds as the vampire offspring of a vampire mother and human father, the protagonist, Lydia, identifies with the Three Girls and speculates that they were vampires: "I'm pretty sure that all of Sher-Gil's subjects were vampires and that maybe she was one, too..."

Sher-Gil was sometimes known as India's Frida Kahlo because of the "revolutionary" way she blended Western and traditional art forms.

On 30 January 2016, Google celebrated her 103rd birthday with a Google Doodle. In 2018, The New York Times published a belated obituary for her. That year, at a Sotheby's auction in Mumbai, her painting The Little Girl in Blue was sold at auction for a record-breaking 18.69 crores. It is a portrait of her cousin Babit, a resident of Shimla and was painted in 1934, when the subject was eight years old.

In 2021, Sher-Gil's painting Portrait of Denyse was put up for auction by Christie's with an estimated value to be between $1.8-2.8 million. The 1932 portrait features Denyse Proutaux, a Parisian art critic, whom Sher-Gil met in 1931. Proutaux was featured in other Sher-Gil paintings, including Young Girls and Denise Proutaux, which were both included in the exhibition "Amrita Shergil: The Passionate Quest" at the National Gallery of Modern Art in New Delhi.

On 18 September 2023, Sher-Gil's 1937 painting The Story Teller fetched $7.4 million (Rs 61.8 crore) at a recent auction, setting a record for the highest price achieved by an Indian artist. SaffronArt, the auction house, organised the sale on Saturday night. This came just 10 days after modernist Syed Haider Raza's painting, Gestation, fetched ₹ 51.7 crore at Pundole auction house. In a page dedicated to the artwork, SaffronArt said the legendary artist sought to explore the realm of domestic life in The Story Teller.

On October 17–18, 2026, the ShowKeen Hyderabad exhibition by AstaGuru featured a curated selection of modern and contemporary Indian artists, including modern and established masters Amrita Sher-Gil, M. F. Husain, S. H. Raza, Jayant Parikh, K. H. Ara, Krishen Khanna, Ram Kumar, and many more.

== Gallery ==
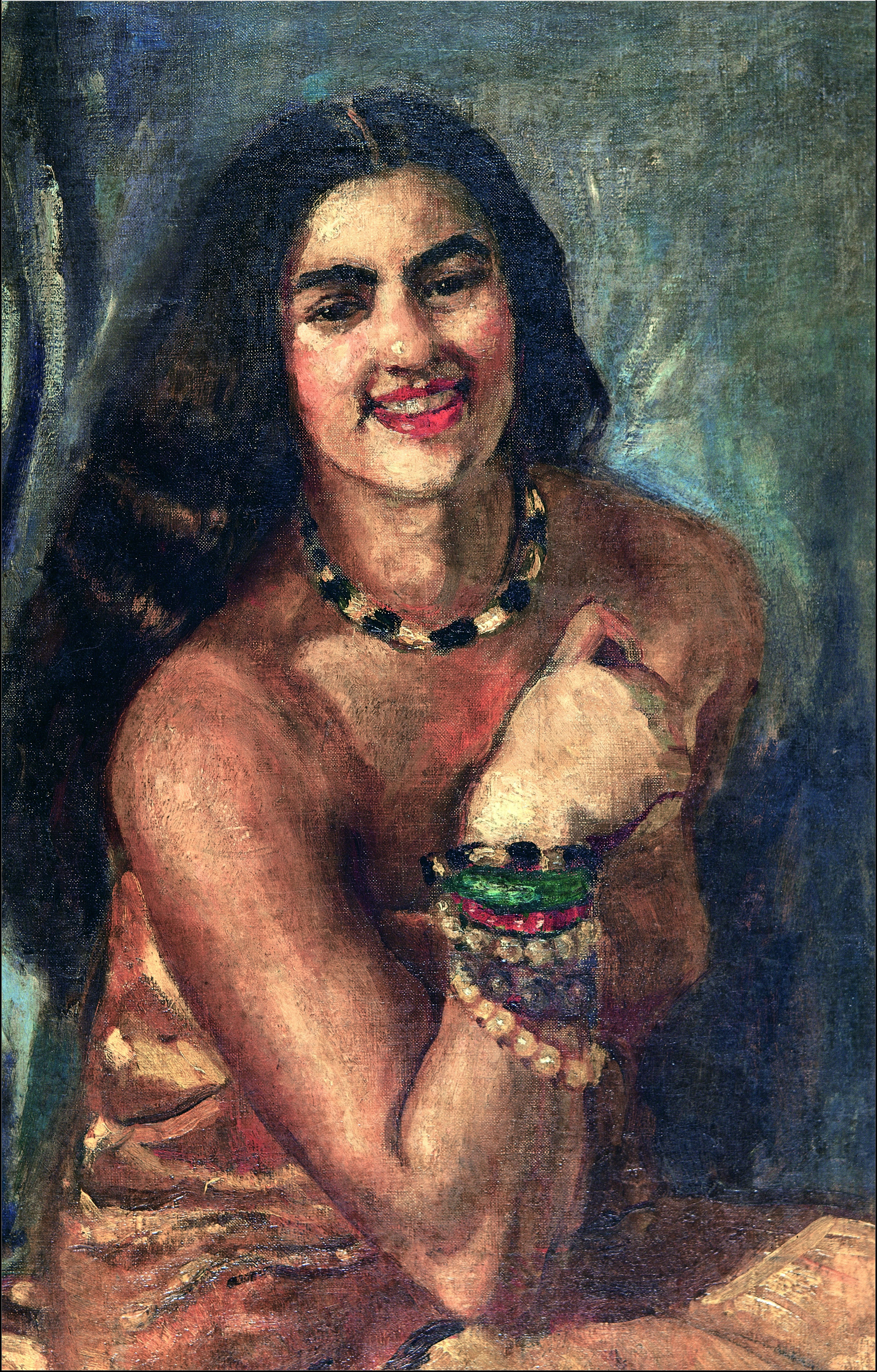
Self-portrait, 1930

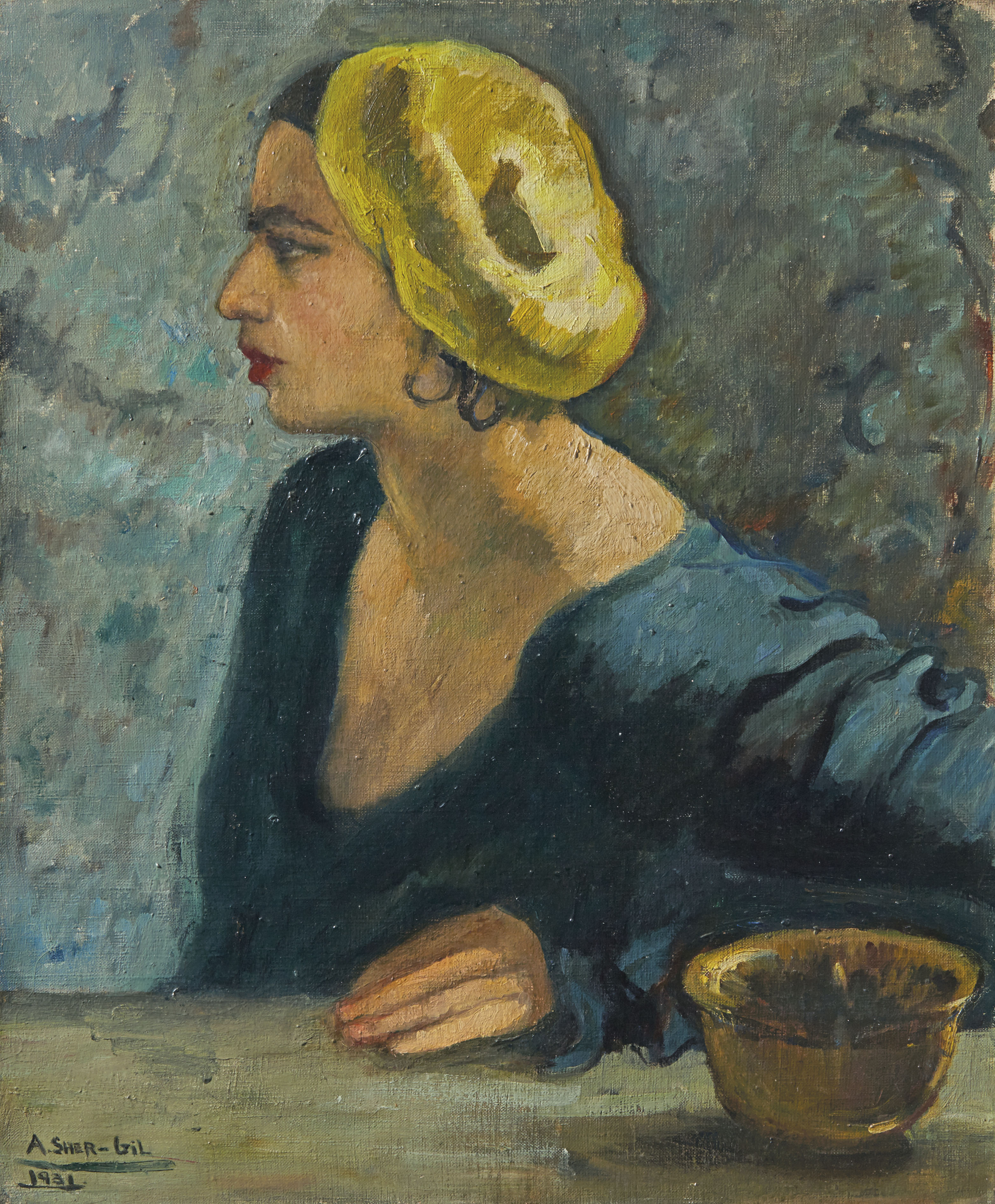
Self-portrait (untitled), 1931

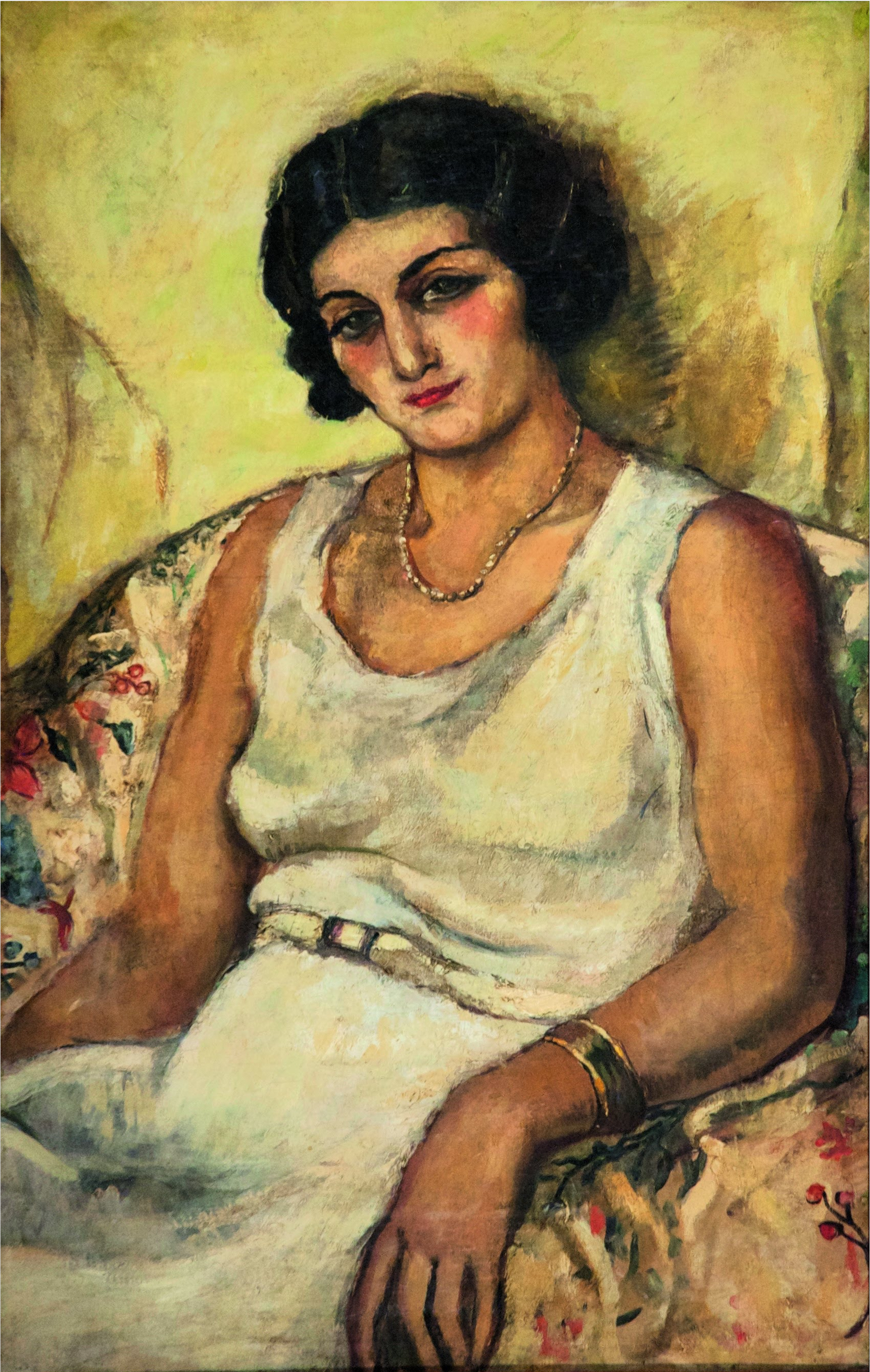
Klára Szepessy, 1932

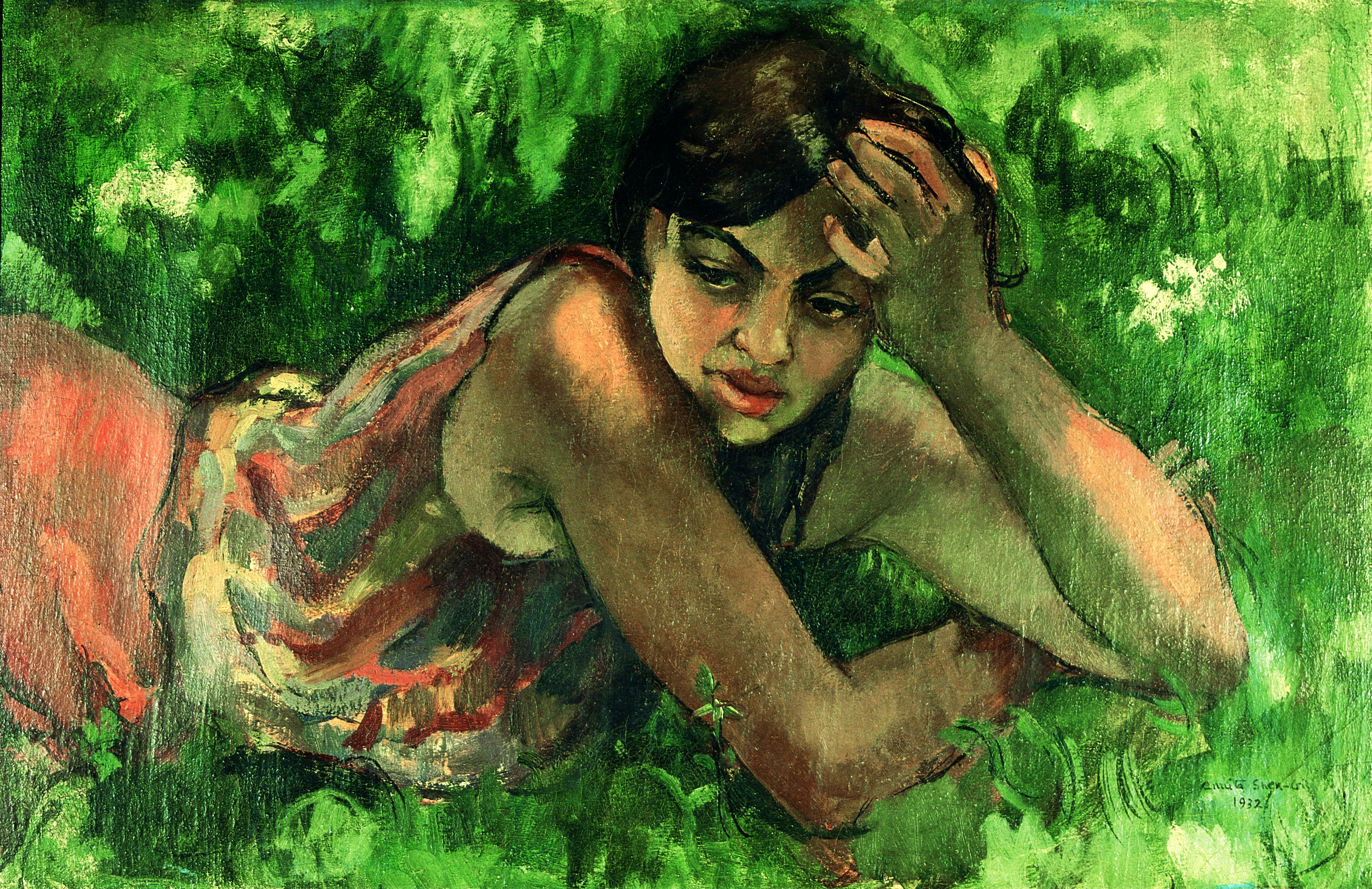
Hungarian Gypsy Girl, 1932 (Note: Originally titled Gypsy Girl.)

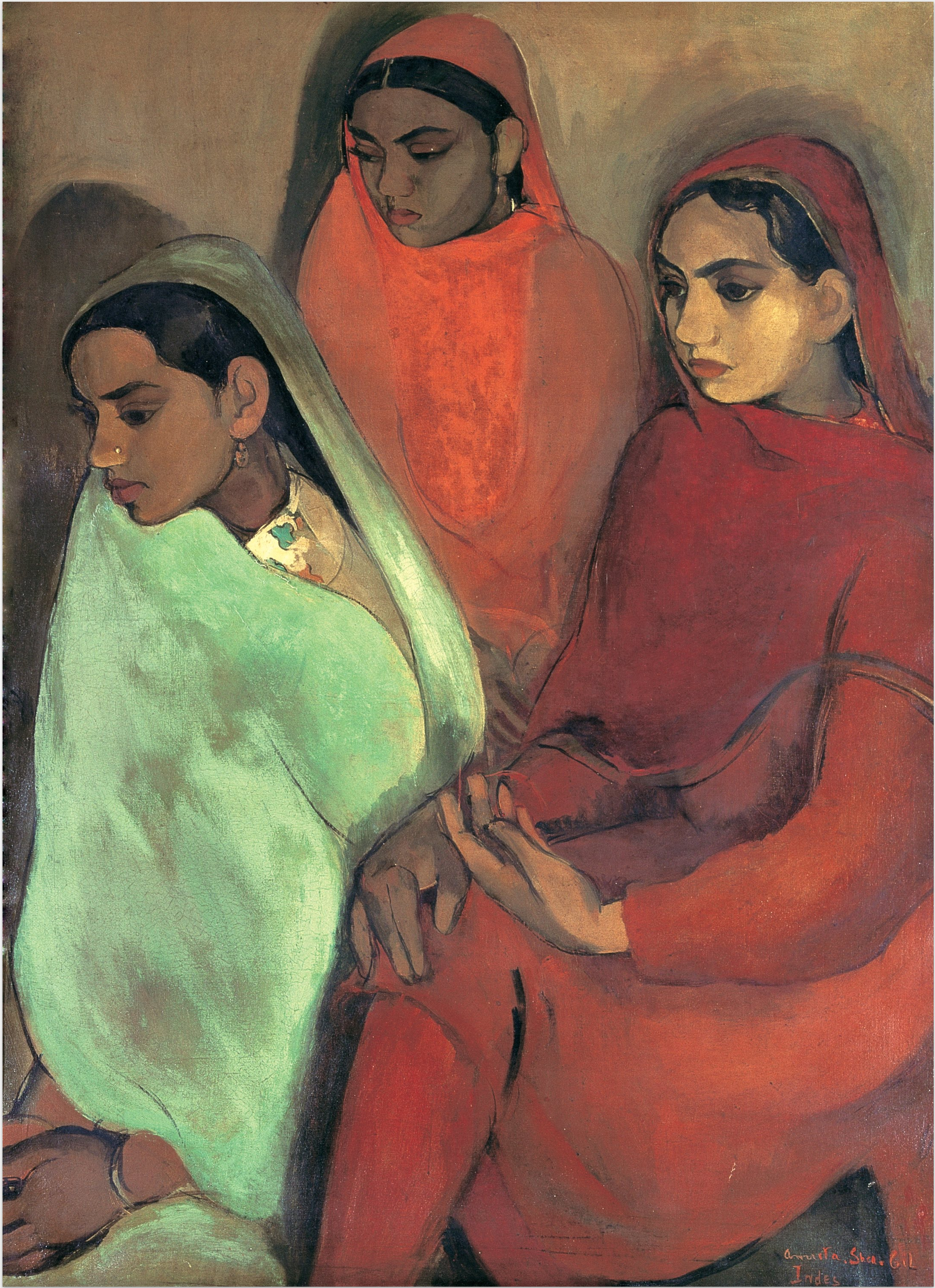
Group of Three Girls, 1935

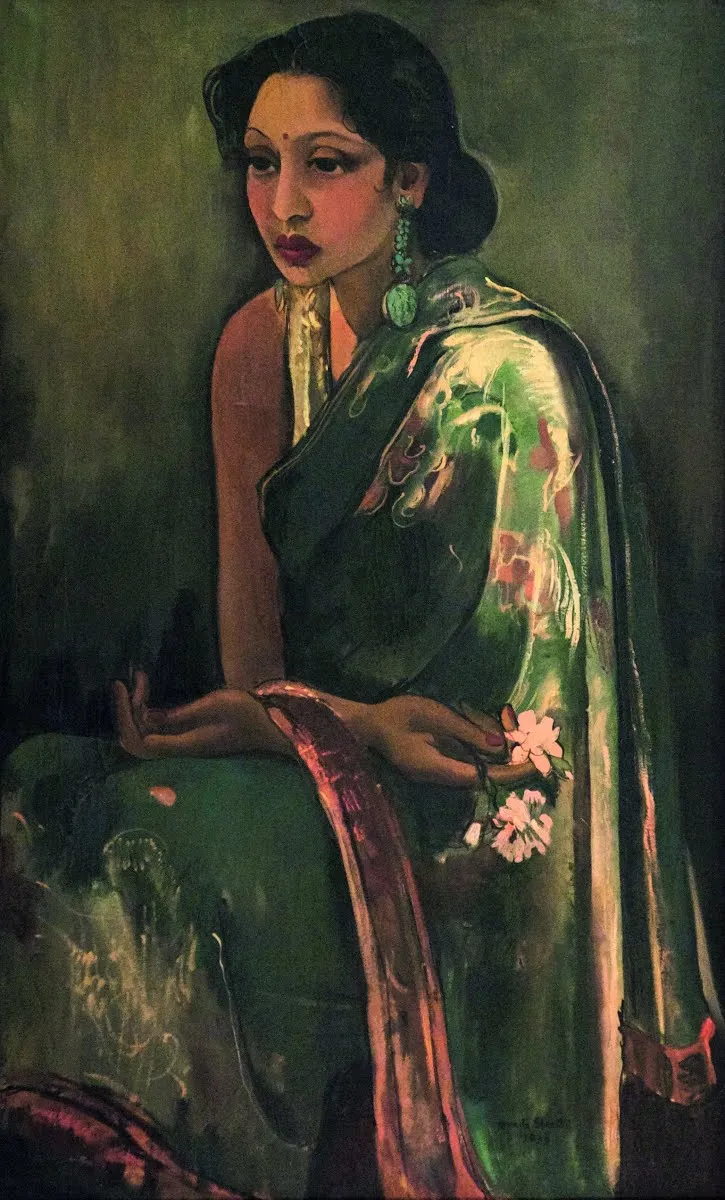
Summer, 1936

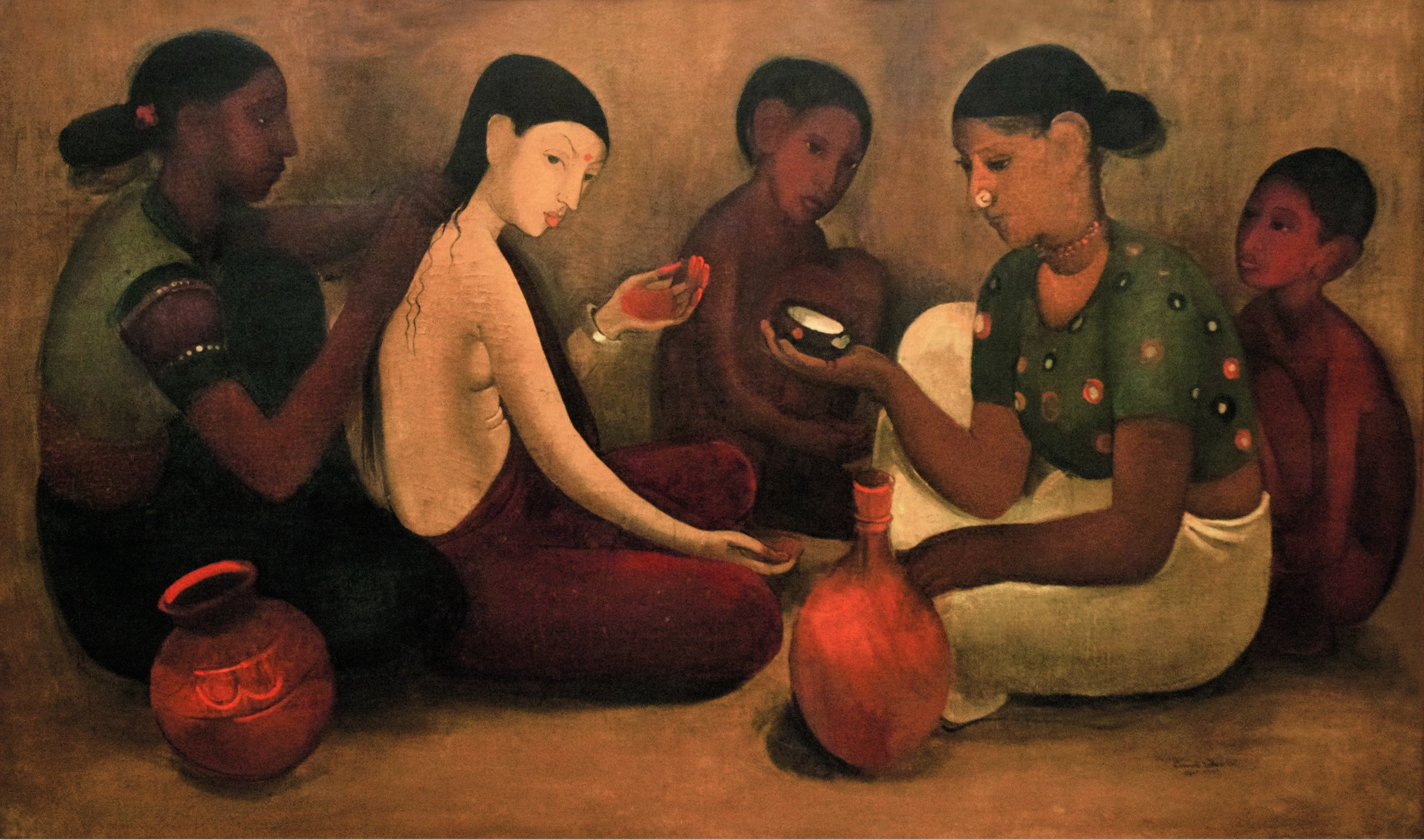
Bride's Toilet, 1937

Village Scene, 1938

== See also ==
- List of paintings by Amrita Sher-Gil
- Amrita Sher-Gil's paintings at Lahore (1937)

== Bibliography ==
- Dalmia, Yashodhara (2013). Amrita Sher-Gil: A Life. Gurugram: Penguin Books. ISBN 978-0-14-342026-2.
- Sundaram, Vivan (2010). Amrita Sher-Gil: A Self-Portrait in Letters and Writings. Vol. 1. New Delhi: Tulika Books. pp. 1–417. ISBN 978-81-89487-59-1.
- Sundaram, Vivan (2010). Amrita Sher-Gil: A Self-Portrait in Letters and Writings. Vol. 2. New Delhi: Tulika Books. pp. 418–821. ISBN 978-81-89487-59-1.
