= Badrul =

Badrul or Badrol is a masculine given name and surname of Arabic origin. Notable people with the name include:

== Given name ==
=== Badrol ===
- Badrol Hisham Hashim, Malaysian politician

=== Badrul ===
- Badrul Hisham Abdullah, Malaysian politician
- Badrul Afzan (born 1976), Malaysian football manager and player
- Badrul Alam (1929–1980), Bangladeshi language activist, physician, and academic
- Badrul Alam (officer) (1948–2023), Bangladeshi Air Force officer
- Badrulamin Bahron, Malaysian politician and academic
- Badrul Haider Chowdhury (1925–1998), Bangladeshi judge
- Badrulzaman Abdul Halim (born 1978), Malaysian footballer
- Badrul Kamal (1945–2026), Indonesian politician
- Badrul Khan, Bangladesh-American author and educator
- Badrul Islam Ali Khan, Indian barrister, politician, and activist
- Badrul Hisyam Abdul Manap (born 1997), Malaysian runner
- Badrul Hasan Qasmi (born 1955), Indian Islamic scholar, jurist, and writer
- Badrul Feisal Abdul Rahim (1969–2020), Malaysian businessman
- Badrul Anam Saud (born 1975/76), Bangladeshi film director and scriptwriter
- Badrul Hisham Shaharin (born 1978), Malaysian activist and politician

== Surname ==
=== Badrul ===
- Farid Badrul (born 1993), Malaysian motorcycle racer

== See also ==
- Badrul-Badur, a princess whom Aladdin married in The Story of Aladdin
