= Bangladeshi Americans =

Americans of Bangladeshi birth or descent

Bengali: বাংলাদেশী মার্কিনী (Bangladeshi Markin)

Total population
- ▲600,000 (2025 est.) (ancestry or ethnic origin or born in Bangladesh all included); 333,026 (2020 US Census) (only those born in Bangladesh)

Regions with significant populations
- New York; Massachusetts; Pennsylvania; New Jersey; Connecticut; Rhode Island; Ohio; Michigan; Illinois; Wisconsin; Delaware; Maryland; Virginia; North Carolina; Georgia; Florida; Minneapolis; Arkansas; Texas; Denver; Seattle; Nevada; Los Angeles

Languages
- Bengali; American English

Religion
- Majority: Islam; Minority: Hinduism, Christianity, Buddhism and Irreligion (including atheism, agnosticism and secularism)

Related ethnic groups
- Asian Americans; South Asian Americans; Bengali Americans; Bangladeshi diaspora; Bangladeshis

Bangladeshi Americans (Bengali: বাংলাদেশী মার্কিনী, romanized: Bangladeshī Markinī) are American citizens with Bangladeshi origin or descent. Bangladeshi Americans are predominantly Bengali Muslims. Since the early 1970s, Bangladeshi immigrants have arrived in significant numbers to become one of the fastest-growing ethnic groups in the U.S. New York City is home to as many as two-thirds of the Bangladeshi American population. Meanwhile, Paterson, New Jersey; Atlantic City, New Jersey; Monroe Township, Middlesex County (New Jersey), and Hamtramck, Michigan are home to smaller but sizable Bangladeshi communities.

== History ==
Immigrants from present-day Bangladesh have been in the United States since at least the First World War, originating from East Bengal of British India.

Since the independence of Bangladesh in 1971, immigration to the United States grew slowly but steadily through the 1970s and 1980s. Over 10,000 Bangladeshis have immigrated to the United States annually. Many of the migrants settled in urban areas, most notably New York City, but also Baltimore, Paterson, Buffalo, Washington, D.C., Los Angeles, Boston, Chicago and Detroit.

In New York, it was estimated that 15,000 Bangladeshis resided in the city in the early 1980s. During the late 1970s, some Bangladeshis moved from New York City to urban centers like Detroit, with prominent communities of other Muslim Americans, in search of better work opportunities and an affordable cost of living, but most have since returned from Detroit to New York and to New Jersey, in hope of starting a new community and a peaceful life. In Atlantic City, Bangladeshis established an association, and two smaller Melas are held in June/July and in August.

The Los Angeles Bangladesh Association was created in 1971, and there were 500 members of the Texas Bangladesh Association in 1997. The Bangladeshi population in Dallas was 5,000 people in 1997, which was large enough to hold the Baishakhi Mela event.

Baishakhi Mela events have been held in major American cities such as New York City; Paterson, New Jersey; Atlantic City; Washington, D.C.; and Los Angeles; as the Bangladeshi population continues to increase in these cities. The third and largest wave of arrivals came in the 1990s and 2000s. Because of the Diversity Immigrant Visa Program, professional and educational criteria were not used. Most Bangladeshi immigrants took blue-collar work such as taxi driving and restaurant help.

== Demography ==
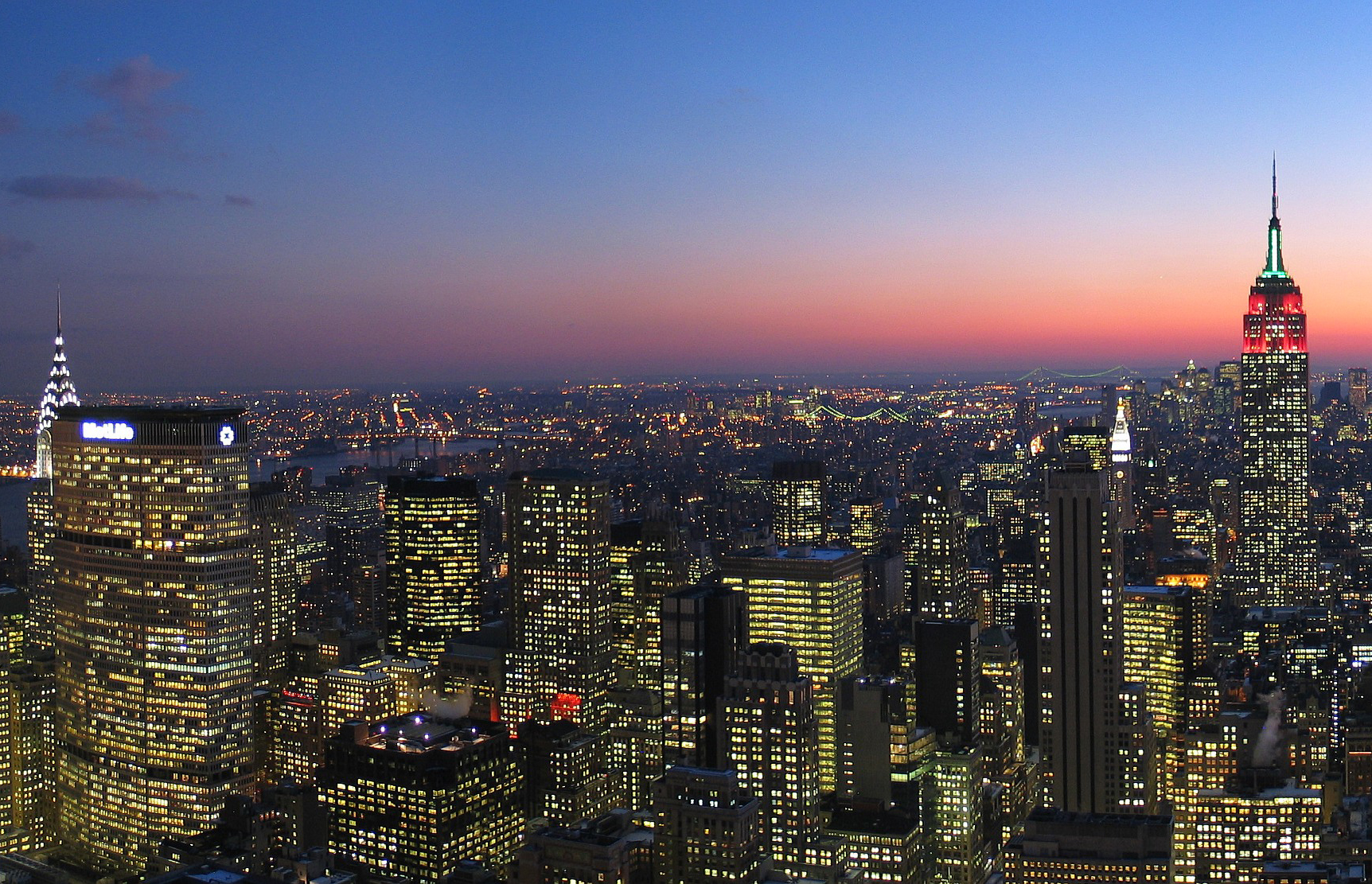
The New York City area, including New York City, Central New Jersey, and Long Island in New York, is home to the largest Bangladeshi-American population.

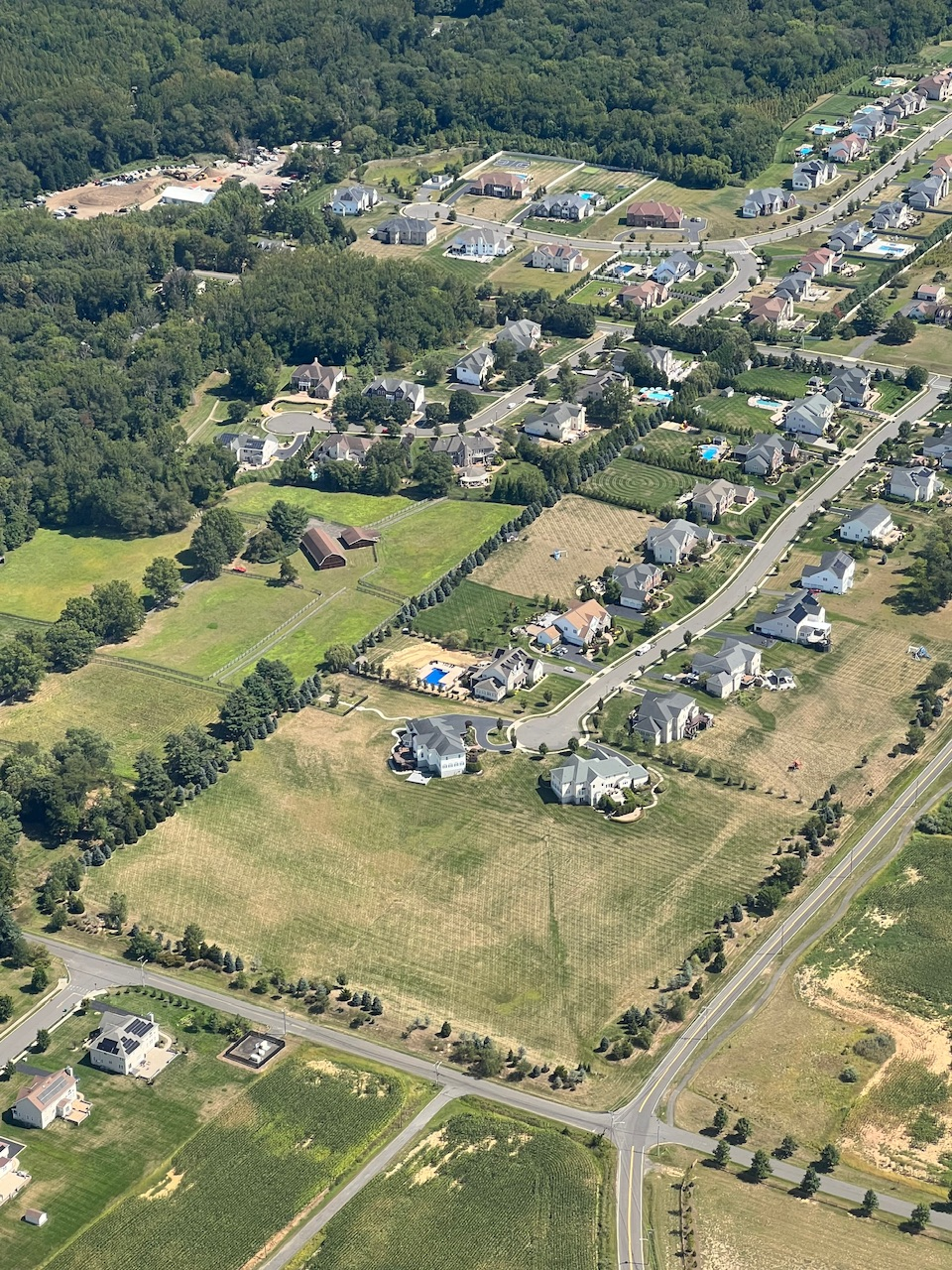
Aerial view of single-family homes nestled within the natural surroundings of trees and greenbelts in affluent suburban Monroe Township, Middlesex County, New Jersey. Bangladeshis value Monroe's proximity to both New York City and top-ranked Princeton University. The Bangladeshi diaspora in this township constitutes the fastest-growing Bangladeshi population in the Western Hemisphere.

=== States, cities, and metro areas by population ===
There are 272,338 Bangladeshis in the country, whereas 256,681 of them are reported as Bangladeshi origin, and the rest are reported as mixed. Bangladeshi Americans are largely concentrated in metropolitan areas in the Northeast, Mid-Atlantic, and Great Lakes regions of the country, especially working-class neighborhoods and suburbs. There are smaller concentrations in states such as Texas, California, and Nevada.

The states with the highest percentages of Bangladeshi Americans are:

State	Bangladeshi population
New York	109,986

Some communities with the highest percentages of Bangladeshi Americans are:

Community	Bangladeshi percentage
Hamtramck, Michigan	57%
Warren, Michigan	15%
Atlantic City, New Jersey	10%
Center Line, Michigan	10%
Detroit, Michigan	4.4%
Hyattsville, Maryland	2.9%
Seven Corners, Virginia	2.7%
New York, New York	2.1%
Paterson, New Jersey	1.7%
Manchester, Connecticut	1.6%
Lincolnia, Virginia	1.37%
Bailey's Crossroads, Virginia	1.2%
Greenbelt, Maryland	1.05%
Elmont, New York	1%
Waterbury, Connecticut	0.8%
South Laurel, Maryland	0.69%
Arlington, Virginia	0.6%
Fayetteville, Arkansas	0.6%
Irving, Texas	0.5%
Reno, Nevada	0.32%

The metropolitan areas with the highest percentages of Bangladeshi Americans are:

Metropolitan area	Bangladeshi percentage	Notable communities
New York, NY/NJ/CT/PA	2%	Queens, NY; Paterson, NJ; Monroe Township, Middlesex County, NJ
Detroit, MI	0.92%	Hamtramck, MI; Warren, MI; Center Line, MI
Washington, DC/VA/MD/WV	0.55%	Fairfax Co., VA; Arlington, VA; Prince George's Co., MD
Dallas-Fort Worth, TX	0.35%	Irving, TX
Buffalo, NY	0.27%	Broadway-Fillmore, Buffalo, NY
Atlanta, GA	0.18%	DeKalb Co., GA
Hartford, CT	0.17%	Manchester, CT
Philadelphia, PA	0.15%	Northeast Philadelphia, PA

== Major communities ==
=== New York City ===
New York City is home to the largest Bangladeshi community in the United States, receiving by far the highest legal permanent resident Bangladeshi immigrant population. The Bangladeshi-born immigrant population has become one of the fastest growing in New York City, counting over 93,000 by 2011 alone. The city's Bangladeshi community is prominent in Jackson Heights, Queens. 74th Street has most of the Bangladeshi grocery stores and clothing stores in Jackson Heights. The Bangladesh Plaza hosts numerous Bangladeshi businesses and cultural events. Recently, one part of Jackson Heights has become an open platform for all sorts of protests and activism. The adjacent neighborhoods of Woodside and Elmhurst in Queens have also drawn Bangladeshi Americans.

In the 1960s, Bangladeshi Americans developed the Manhattan restaurant area called Curry Row. Since the 1970s, thousands of Bangladeshis have been able to legally migrate to the U.S. through the Diversity Visa Program lottery. Centered on 169th Street and Hillside Avenue, Jamaica has become a popular draw due to the large number of Bangladeshi restaurants and grocery stores. Sagar Restaurant, Gharoa, Deshi Shaad, Kabir's Bakery, and other stores in Queens are attractions for the Bangladeshi community from throughout New York City. The largest numbers of Bangladeshi Americans now live in the Queens neighborhoods of Jamaica, Jackson Heights, Hollis, and Briarwood. Bangladeshi enclaves have also emerged in Parkchester, Bronx; Ozone Park, Queens; Kensington, Brooklyn; and City Line, Brooklyn. More affluent Bangladeshis have relocated to Long Island, largely due to many Bangladeshi-owned pharmaceutical companies that also employ many Bangladeshis there. However, a relatively small number of Bangladeshis have moved from New York City to cities such as Buffalo, New York, and Hamtramck, Michigan, mainly due to low costs of living there.

=== New York statistics ===
- 1990 census:
  - Total population: 10,000 (7,592 in New York State and 29,000 in total in the United States).
  - Highest concentrations: Queens—2,567 people, and Brooklyn—1,313.
  - In Manhattan, Bangladeshis formed a small enclave on 6th Street. Larger numbers lived in the Astoria area of Queens.
- 2000 census:
  - Total population: 28,269
  - Highest concentrations: Queens—18,310 people (65%), Brooklyn—6,243 (22%), Bronx—2,442 (9%), Manhattan—1,204 (4%), Staten Island—70 (0.2%)
  - Population growth rate from 1970 to 2000: 471%
  - Foreign-born population: 83,967 (100%)
  - Limited English proficiency: 14,840 (60%)
  - Median Household Income: $45,537
  - People Living in Poverty: 10,500
  - Percentage of people in poverty: 40%
- 2010 census:
  - Total population: 100,000
  - Highest concentrations: Queens (60%), Brooklyn (19%), Bronx (17%), Manhattan (4%), Staten Island (0.4%)
  - Population growth rate from 2000 to 2010:
  - Foreign-born population: 80%
  - Limited English proficiency: 78%
  - Median Household Income: $36,741
  - Percentage of people in poverty: 32%

Bangladeshi neighborhoods in New York City include Jamaica, Jamaica Hills, Briarwood, Jackson Heights, Woodside, Elmhurst, Hollis, Queens Village, Hunters Point, Long Island City, East Harlem, Bayside, Hillcrest, West Maspeth, and Astoria in Queens; Kensington and City Line in Brooklyn; and Parkchester and Castle Hill in The Bronx. Smaller Little Bangladesh communities can be found in Philadelphia; Washington, D.C.; Detroit; and Los Angeles.

=== Paterson, New Jersey ===
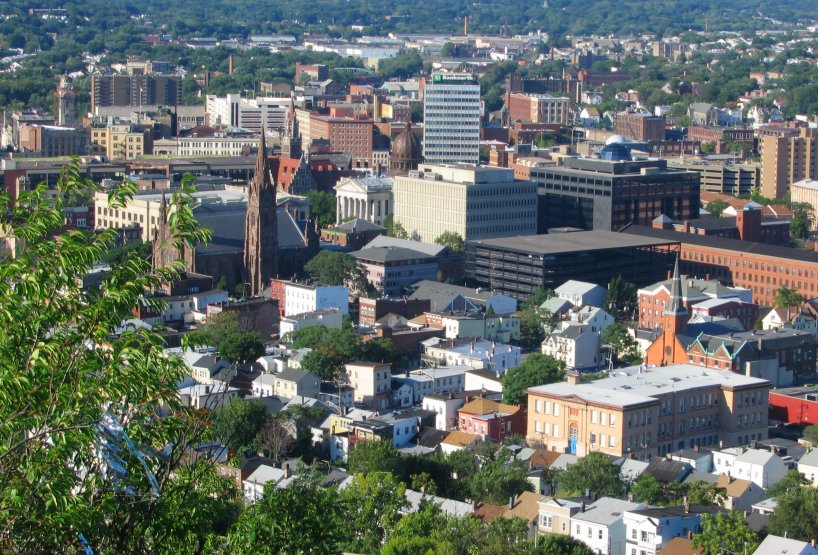
Paterson, New Jersey, in the New York City area, is home to the second largest Bangladeshi American population, after New York City.

Paterson, New Jersey, in the New York City area, is home to a significant and growing Bangladeshi American community. Many Bangladeshi grocery stores and clothing stores operate in the emerging Little Bangladesh on Union Avenue and on nearby streets in Paterson, as well as a branch of a subsidiary of Sonali Bank, the largest state-owned financial institution in Bangladesh. The Masjid Al-Ferdous mosque is also located on Union Avenue. Mohammed Akhtaruzzaman was ultimately certified as the winner of the 2012 City Council election in the Second Ward, making him northern New Jersey's first Bangladeshi-American elected official. The current Second Ward Councilman is Bangladeshi Shahin Khalique, who defeated Akhtaruzzaman in 2016 as well as in 2020. Khalique has largely stimulated growth and advancement of the Bengali community in Paterson.

On 11 October 2014, a groundbreaking ceremony was conducted for the Shohid Minar Monument in West Side Park in Paterson. The monument pays tribute to those killed in erstwhile East Pakistan in 1952 (modern day Bangladesh), while protesting Pakistan's ban on the use of Bangladeshis' native language - Bengali. The monument is modeled after similar monuments in Bangladesh, according to the World Glam Organization, the Bangladeshi cultural group working on the Paterson project. The Shohid Minar Monument was completed and unveiled in 2015. This project reflected the increasing influence of Paterson's growing Bangladeshi community as reported in The Record.

== Community and economic issues ==
=== Per capita income ===
In 2014, identified by factfinder census, when Americans per capita income was divided by ethnic groups, Bangladeshi Americans were revealed to have a per capita income of only $18,027, below the American average of $25,825.

=== Median household income ===
In 2023, Bangladeshi Americans had an estimated median household income of $78,400.

=== Poverty ===
In 2013, Algernon Austin of the Economic Policy Institute stated on Tell Me More that "when you break it down by specific ethnic groups, the Hmong, the Bangladeshi, they have poverty rates that rival the African-American poverty rate."

== Education ==
In the 2000 U.S. census, 57,412 people reported having Bangladeshi origin. In 2015, it was reported that 16% of the Bangladeshi population in the US had at least a bachelor's degree. Almost 22% of Bangladeshis over the age of 25 earned at least a bachelor's degree, compared to less than 25% of the U.S. population.

== Politics ==
Bangladeshi Americans strongly favor the Democratic Party. Republican President Richard Nixon's support of Pakistan during Bangladesh's struggle for independence partly swayed Bangladeshis to the Democratic Party. In the 2012 U.S. presidential election, 96% of Bangladeshi Americans voted to reelect Barack Obama. In the 2016 U.S. presidential election, 90% of Bangladeshi Americans voted for Hillary Clinton. In the 2020 U.S. presidential election, 91% of Bangladeshi Americans voted for Joe Biden.

In recent decades, the Bangladeshi-American community has become more active in local and national politics, with many Bangladeshi Americans seeking office or forming political organizations to better represent those within or outside the community who share similar goals.

== Culture ==
Bangladeshi Americans are highly visible in medicine, engineering, business, finance, and information technology. Bangladeshi Americans have introduced Bengali cuisine in America through several Bangladeshi markets, restaurants and stores. Some of the largest are in New York City; Paterson, New Jersey; Central New Jersey; Washington, D.C.; Atlantic City, New Jersey; and Los Angeles, California.

=== Languages ===
Bangladeshi Americans often retain their native languages, such as Bengali, and run many programs to nourish their mother tongues. Many also speak regional dialects of Bengali, such as Sylheti (prevalent in Bangladesh's Sylhet Division) as well as Chittagonian (prevalent in Bangladesh's Chittagong and Cox's Bazar Districts) & Noakhailla (prevalent in Bangladesh's Noakhali District), among many other dialects from various regions.

=== Religion ===
Before the colonization of South Asia by the Turkic and subsequent British Empires, folk religion in villages in the Bengal region incorporated elements of Hinduism, Buddhism, and Islam to varying degrees. Leading up to the modern period, Bengali families increasingly began identifying with a single religious community. In North America, Bangladeshis residing in rural areas often practice their faith at home and make special trips during community holidays like Ramadan and Durga Puja. In cities such as Detroit and New York, Bangladeshi Muslims attend religious activities in their local mosques. Bangladeshi Americans have taken on leadership roles at major Hindu temples in the U.S.

== Notable people ==
Here is a list of notable individuals in alphabetical order:

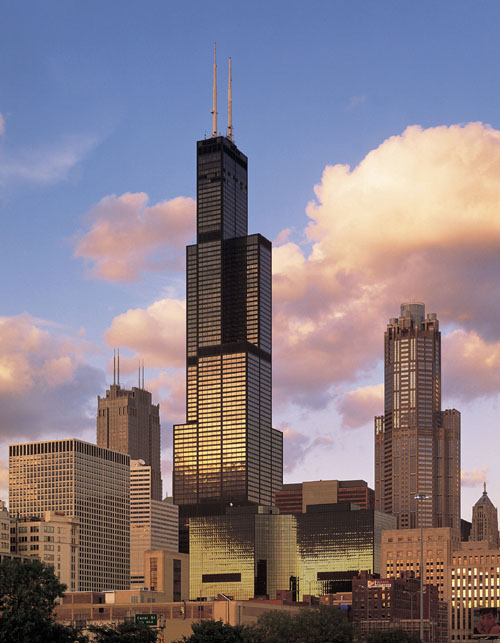
Sears Tower (now Willis Tower) was designed by Fazlur Rahman Khan. It was the tallest building in the world for over two decades.

- Abul Hussam – chemist, inventor of the Sono arsenic filter
- Abdus Suttar Khan – chemist and jet fuels inventor
- Anik Khan – rapper
- Arianna Afsar – former Miss California; placed in the Top 10 of the 2011 Miss America pageant
- Asif Azam Siddiqi – space historian, assistant professor of history at Fordham University
- Badal Roy – tabla player, percussionist, and recording artist
- Badrul Khan – founder of modern e-learning
- Fazle Hussain – professor of mechanical engineering, and earth science at the University of Houston
- Fazlur Rahman Khan – pioneer of modern structural engineering
- Firoz Mahmud – interdisciplinary media artist
- Hansen Clarke – member of U.S. House of Representatives (2011–2013) from Michigan's 13th District
- Hasan M. Elahi – interdisciplinary media artist
- Imran Khan – tech investor and entrepreneur. Chief Strategy Officer of Snap Inc, Leading Alibaba Group IPO, leading Snap IPO
- Iqbal Quadir – founder of Grameenphone, Bangladesh's largest mobile phone company; headed the MIT Legatum Center
- Jai Wolf – electronic music producer
- Jawed Karim – co-founder of YouTube, designed key parts of PayPal
- Kamal Quadir – entrepreneur; founded two of Bangladesh's key technology companies, CellBazaar and bKash
- Maqsudul Alam (d. 2014) – scientist and professor at University of Hawaii
- Marjana Chowdhury – model, philanthropist and beauty queen Miss Bangladesh USA
- M. Osman Siddique – former U.S. ambassador
- M. Zahid Hasan – scientist and professor of quantum physics at Princeton University- known for seminal discoveries in quantum physics. Fellow of American Academy of Arts and Sciences.
- Mir Masoom Ali – George and Frances Ball Distinguished Professor of Statistics, Ball State University
- Mohammad Ataul Karim – electrical engineer
- Monica Yunus – Bangladeshi-Russian-American operatic soprano
- Mushfiq Mobarak - Bangladeshi American economist and a professor at Yale University
- Naeem Mohaiemen – academic, filmmaker, writer, visual artist
- Omar Ishrak - business executive, chairman of Intel and Medtronic
- Palbasha Siddique – singer
- Rahat Hossain – YouTuber listed as MagicofRahat
- Rais Bhuiyan – shooting survivor and activist
- Reihan Salam – conservative American political commentator; blogger at The American Scene; associate editor of The Atlantic Monthly
- Rumman Chowdhury – data scientist and AI ethicist
- Salman Khan – founder of Khan Academy, a nonprofit educational organisation
- Saif Ahmad – World Series of Poker winner
- Sezan Mahmud – award-winning novelist
- Shikhee – singer, auteur of industrial band Android Lust
- Shomi Patwary – designer and music video director
- Shuvo Roy – co-inventor of artificial kidney, medical MEMS, scientist, and engineer.

== See also ==
- Bengali diaspora
- Bengali Americans
- Little Bangladesh, Los Angeles
- Bangladesh–United States relations
