= Quadir =

Quadir is a name. Notable people with the name include:

- Quadir Maynard (born 1993), Bermudian footballer
- Abdul Quadir (1906–1984), Bangladeshi poet
- Iqbal Quadir (born 1958), Bangladeshi entrepreneur
- Kamal Quadir, Bangladeshi entrepreneur
