= UMW =

UMW may refer to:

- UMW Holdings
- UMW Toyota Motor (Malaysia)
- United Mine Workers, coal miners' union in U.S.
- University of Mary Washington
- University of Minnesota Waseca
- University of Montana Western
- University-Mount Wellington, New Zealand football club
- United Methodist Women
