= Piickme =

Bangladeshi ridesharing company

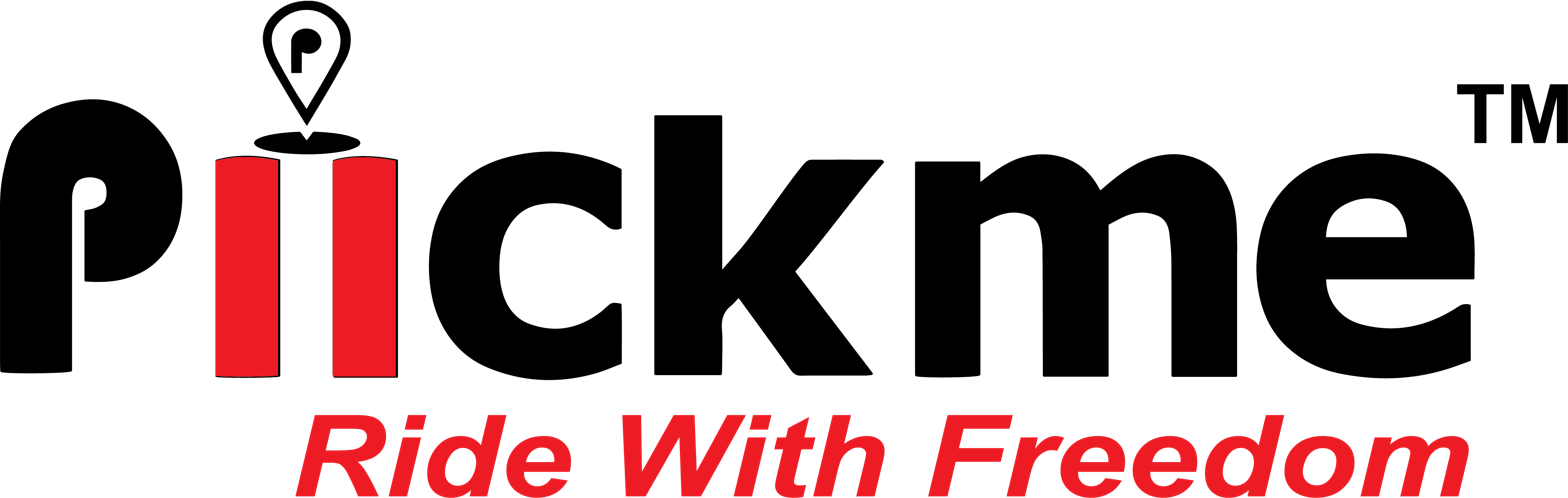
- Currently used
- Company type: Privately held company
- Industry: Transportation
- Founded: November 2017; 8 years ago
- Founder: Omar Ali.
- Headquarters: Dhaka, Bangladesh, Dhaka, Bangladesh
- Area served: Dhaka, Bangladesh
- Key people: MD Ripan Mia (CEO)
- Products: Mobile app
- Services: Vehicle for hire
- Website: piickme.com

Piickme (Bengali: পিকমি) was a local ridesharing company founded and headquartered in Dhaka, Bangladesh. The company develops and operates the mobile application, which allows people to request a motor bike or car from their smartphone. It provides its services in only Dhaka City of Bangladesh.

== History ==
Piickme started its operation in 2018 with freelance based motorcycles and private cars. By December 2018, more than 25000 drivers and around 100000 users signed up for the service. Piickme started with the sole funding of the founder and CEO Omar Ali.

The last recorded version of the website was from January 2022 and since then the website has not advertised the original service.

== Services ==
Piickme operates their app, which enables people to get rides from their smartphones. Piickme's Apps is available for Android & iOS. People can able to choose a payment method like cash, credit card, bKash, iPay & local banks. The user requests a ride. Once the driver accepts the requested ride, the user will be able to see the ride details such as driver name, vehicle details, driver details. After the ride is completed user need to Pay by Cash or Online Payment.
