= Lokman =

- Gender: Male given name (Arabic/Islamic)
- Language: Arabic

Origin
- Origin: Semitic
- Meaning: "Favour Of The All-merciful, Allah" (لقمان)

Lokman (Arabic: لقمان) is an Arabic given name for males meaning "favour of the All-Merciful (Allah)". Notable people with the name include:

== People ==
- Lokman Khan Sherwani (1910–1969), Indian politician
- Lokman Yusof, Malaysian politician
- Lokman Yeung, member of Hong Kong Cantopop boy band

== See also ==
- Luqman
