= Helen Chaman Lall =

Indian art collector (1910/1912–2003)

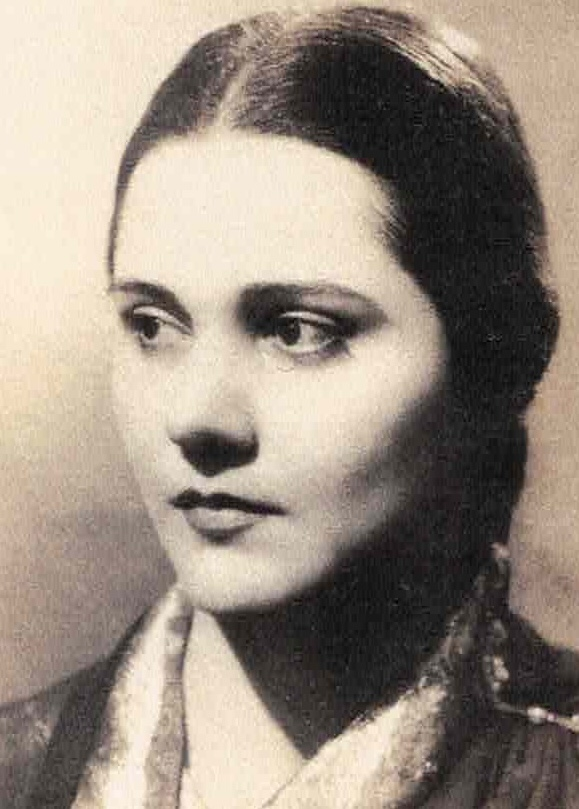
- Helen Chaman Lall (1930s)
- Born: Helen Ali Khan; 1910 or 1912; Amritsar, Punjab, British India
- Died: 2003; United Kingdom
- Known for: Art collection Feature of a portrait by Amrita Sher-Gil

Helen Chaman Lall (1910 or 1912 – 2003), sometimes spelled Helen Chamanlal, and also known as Helen Lall, was an Indian collector of art and jewellery. She was the subject of a painting by Indian-Hungarian artist Amrita Sher-Gil.

Lall graduated in medicine, though never practised. In 1936, she married the Indian politician and diplomat Diwan Chaman Lall. She spent her final years of life in England.

== Early life and education ==
Helen Chaman Lall née Ali Khan was born in 1910, or 1912, in Amritsar, to Badrul Islam Ali Khan, a Pathan aristocrat and barrister, and his wife Violet Love, a British woman. Her sister was Leila (also known as Leela) Sikri, who married S. M. Sikri. Lall graduated in medicine in 1934, though never practised.

== Personal and family ==
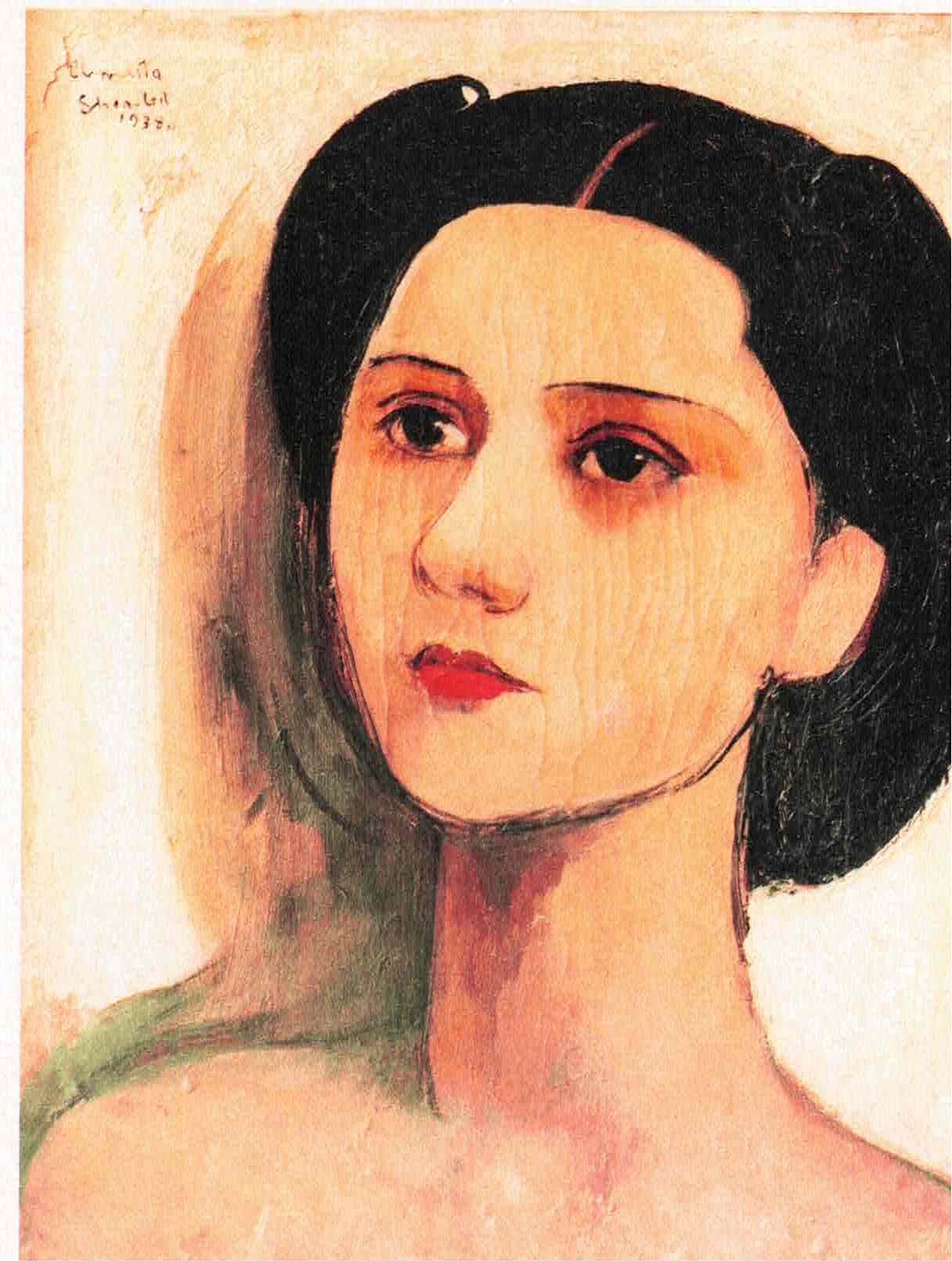
Portrait of Helen by Amrita Sher-Gil (January 1938)

In 1936, against her father's wishes, Lall married the Indian politician and diplomat Diwan Chaman Lall. They lived in Mashobra, and in 1939 they had a son, named Rahul. She was known for her collections of miniatures and jewellery, including Balwant Singh relaxing in front of a fireplace by Nainsukh of Guler.

The Indian-Hungarian artist Amrita Sher-Gil was a close friend of Lall. After her solo exhibition at Faletti's Hotel in November 1937 Lahore, Sher-Gil stayed on at the hotel with the Lalls in January 1938 and painted portraits for which she typically charged ₹500 per head. She wrote to her parents that in Lahore, she spent most of her time with the Lalls who were "good to me [her]" and that she had begun a portrait of Helen for which she did not want to receive any fee. The portrait was completed in Lahore in January 1938. According to Sher-Gil's nephew Vivan Sundaram, the whereabouts of the painting is unknown.

When Sher-Gil died in December 1941, Lall was by her side.

She later moved to England to be near her son, who had separated from his wife. Her son later died in a house fire in India, apparently caused by his lit cigarette..

== Death ==
Lall spent her final years in England. She died in 2003.

== Bibliography ==
- Dalmia, Yashodhara (2013). Amrita Sher-Gil: A Life. Gurugram: Penguin Books. ISBN 978-0-14-342026-2.
- Sundaram, Vivan (2010). Amrita Sher-Gil: A Self-Portrait in Letters and Writings. Vol. 1. New Delhi: Tulika Books. pp. 1–417. ISBN 978-81-89487-59-1.
- Sundaram, Vivan (2010). Amrita Sher-Gil: A Self-Portrait in Letters and Writings. Vol. 2. New Delhi: Tulika Books. pp. 418–821. ISBN 978-81-89487-59-1.
