= UMW Toyota Motor =

Malaysian car distributor

UMW Toyota Motor Sdn. Bhd. (UMWT) is the appointed Toyota distributor, assembler and exporter of Toyota vehicles in Malaysia. The company was founded in October 1982 as Sejati Motor, prior to being renamed UMW Toyota Motor in October 1987.

UMW Toyota Motor is a 51:39:10 joint venture between Malaysia-based United Motor Works (UMW), and the Toyota Motor Corporation and Toyota Tsusho Corporation of Japan. UMWT wholly owns Assembly Services Sdn. Bhd. (ASSB), the exclusive assembler of Toyota passenger and commercial vehicles in Malaysia.

UMW Toyota Motor has also been the official distributor of Lexus vehicles in Malaysia since 2006.

== History ==
=== 1960s ===
Toyota vehicles were first imported into Malaysia in August 1956, with the first unit being a Land Cruiser. Toyota signed distributor agreements with various Malaysian partners prior to UMW Toyota Motor, namely Asia Motor (1956–1960), Kah Motor (September 1960–February 1974), Borneo Motors (September 1967–September 1982), Sarin Motor (January 1979–February 1983) and Emastorin Motor (September 1979–April 1984). Additionally, two Malaysian plants were appointed as assemblers of Toyota's complete knock down (CKD) kits, namely Champion Motors / Assembly Services and Sarawak Motor Industries.

Prior to 1968, Malaysian market Toyota models were only imported as complete built up (CBU) units. In the 1960s, the Malaysian government began to emphasise industrialisation, then viewed as a more dependable economic sector for employment and economic growth. In May 1964, the Malaysian government enacted a policy to encourage the local assembly of vehicles and manufacturing of automotive components, as per the recommendation of experts from the Colombo Plan. The new policy made complete built up (CBU) cars more expensive through the addition of import duties, and licenses were issued to various car companies who were interested in setting up local assembly plants. Cars that were locally assembled with Malaysian manufactured components, then limited to low-value parts like tyres, lights and batteries would be granted a reduction in import duty, making them cheaper and more competitive as a result.

=== 1970s ===
In the 1970s, Malaysia experienced an economic boom as a result of increased industrialisation. Japanese companies heavily invested in Malaysia during this period, and Toyota was one of several Japanese firms which contributed to the development of Malaysia's automotive industry. Local assembly of the Toyota Corolla (E10) and Toyota Corona (T40) commenced in February 1968 at the Champion Motors (CM) plant in Shah Alam. Toyota exported complete knock down (CKD) kits from Japan to Malaysia, where they were assembled by Champion Motors. However, Toyota had no equity stake in Champion Motors, which was established by Motor Investments (MIB), a subsidiary of London-based Inchcape. In addition to Toyota models, Champion Motors had also assembled Chevrolet, Mercedes-Benz, Vauxhall and Volkswagen models. Champion Motors was renamed Assembly Services Sdn. Bhd. (ASSB) in April 1975.

Over the course of the 1970s, Assembly Services benefited from significant technology transfer from Toyota. Production engineers from Toyota contributed to the design of ASSB's plant and advised on the assembly of vehicles. The Malaysian public, traditionally accustomed to European cars up until the 1960s were initially sceptical of the new Japanese cars. However, by the mid-1970s, the Toyota Corolla had grown rapidly in popularity to become a best-seller in the Malaysian market, second only to the Datsun 120Y. The success of the Corolla was largely attributed to its admirable reliability, fuel efficiency and value for money appeal, elements which many of its European counterparts could not match. The partnership between ASSB and Toyota strengthened over the course of the 1970s, and Toyota vehicles regularly accounted for the bulk of ASSB's production volume.

=== 1980s–present ===
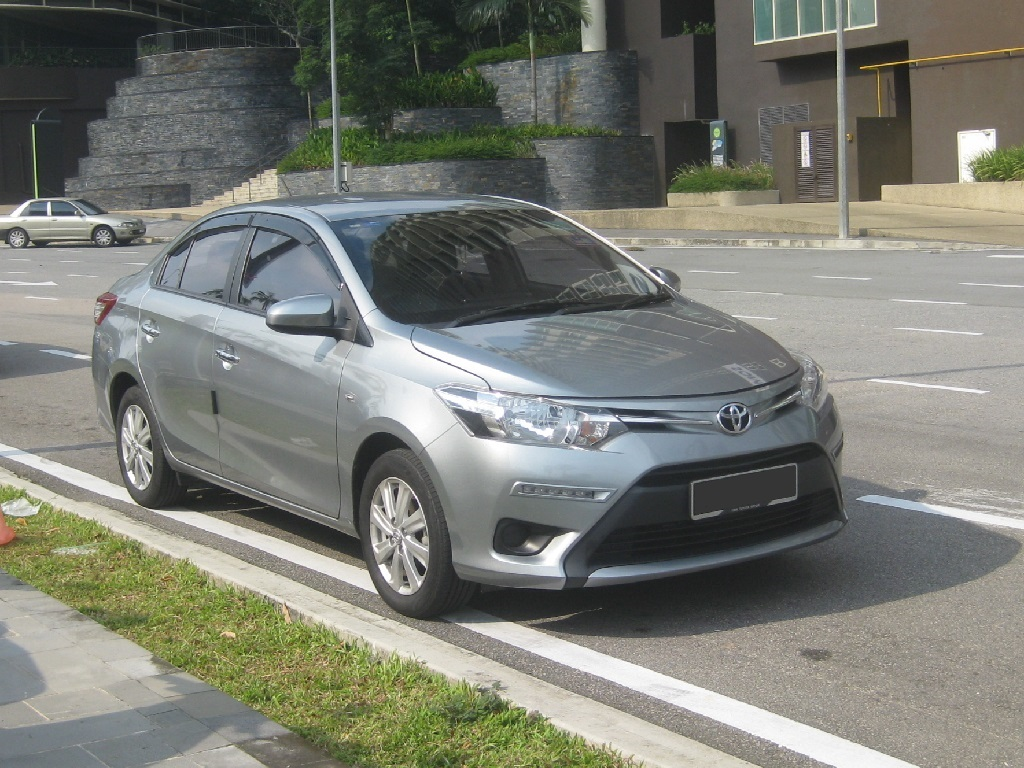
The Toyota Vios is UMW Toyota's best selling model.

In March 1980, Toyota set up a representative office in Kuala Lumpur, and in October 1982, Sejati Motor was established through a joint venture between the Toyota Motor Corporation and United Motor Works (UMW). Sejati Motor acquired the Assembly Services plant and Borneo Motors network from Inchcape, and in October 1987, Sejati Motor was renamed UMW Toyota Motor (UMWT). ASSB remained a subsidiary of UMWT ever since, as the exclusive assembler of Toyota vehicles in Malaysia.

However, UMWT's plans for expansion in the Malaysian market were drafted just prior to the advent of Proton and the mid-1980s economic crisis, both of which had severe implications on UMWT's business model. Nonetheless, UMWT adapted to the market changes by pushing the Toyota brand upmarket, with an emphasis on aftersales and customer satisfaction. Toyota eventually surpassed arch-rival Nissan to become the best-selling foreign-badged car company in the Malaysian market, a title which UMWT held for over 20 years. However, in 2014, UMWT lost their coveted title to Honda Malaysia.

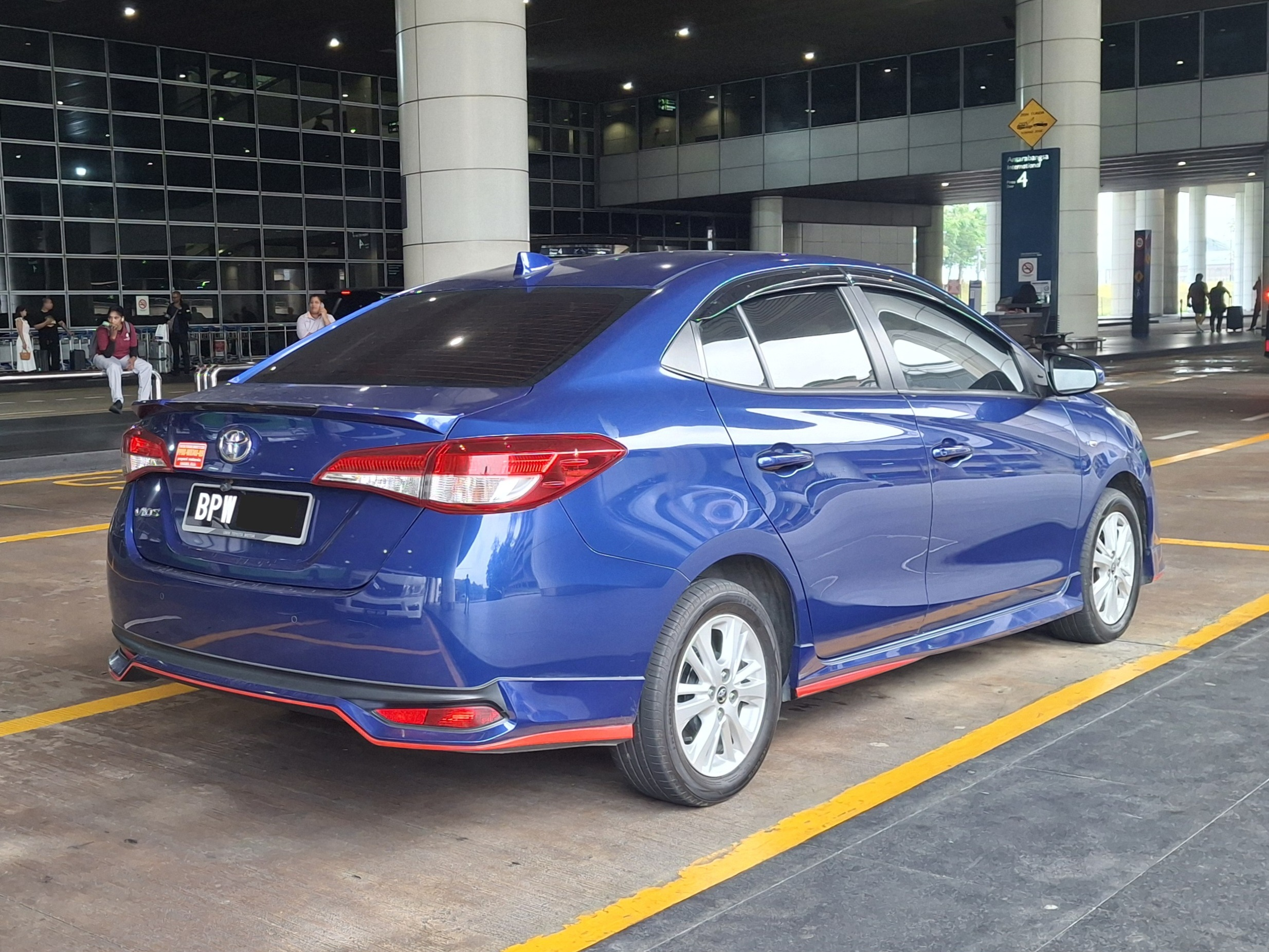
The NSP151 Vios is the first model manufactured at Bukit Raja plant.

In 2006, UMW Toyota Motor was awarded the franchise rights to distribute Lexus vehicles in Malaysia. Cumulative Toyota vehicle production in Malaysia reached 1 million units in 2011. As of late 2017, UMW Toyota officially distributes a total of twelve Toyota models, six of which are assembled by ASSB, while all Lexus models are fully imported.

Another manufacturing plant at Bukit Raja, Klang rolled out its first car on 10 January 2019 which was a Toyota Vios. This plant will operate alongside the existing plant at Shah Alam and during its initial face can have an annual output of 50,000 vehicles. The Yaris is also manufactured in this plant and boosts a 70% local content count.

=== Assembly Services (ASSB) production ===
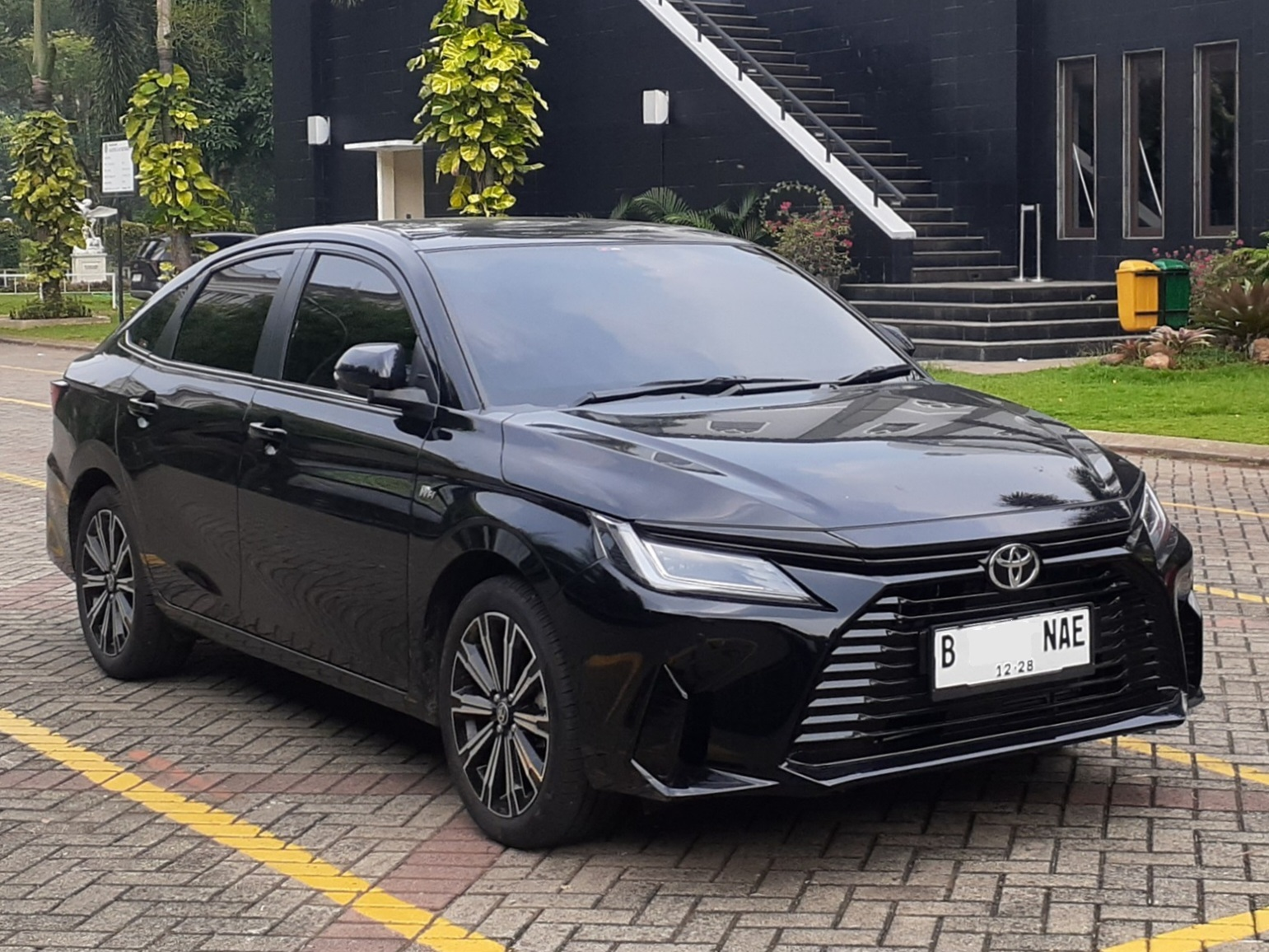
Toyota Vios (AC100)

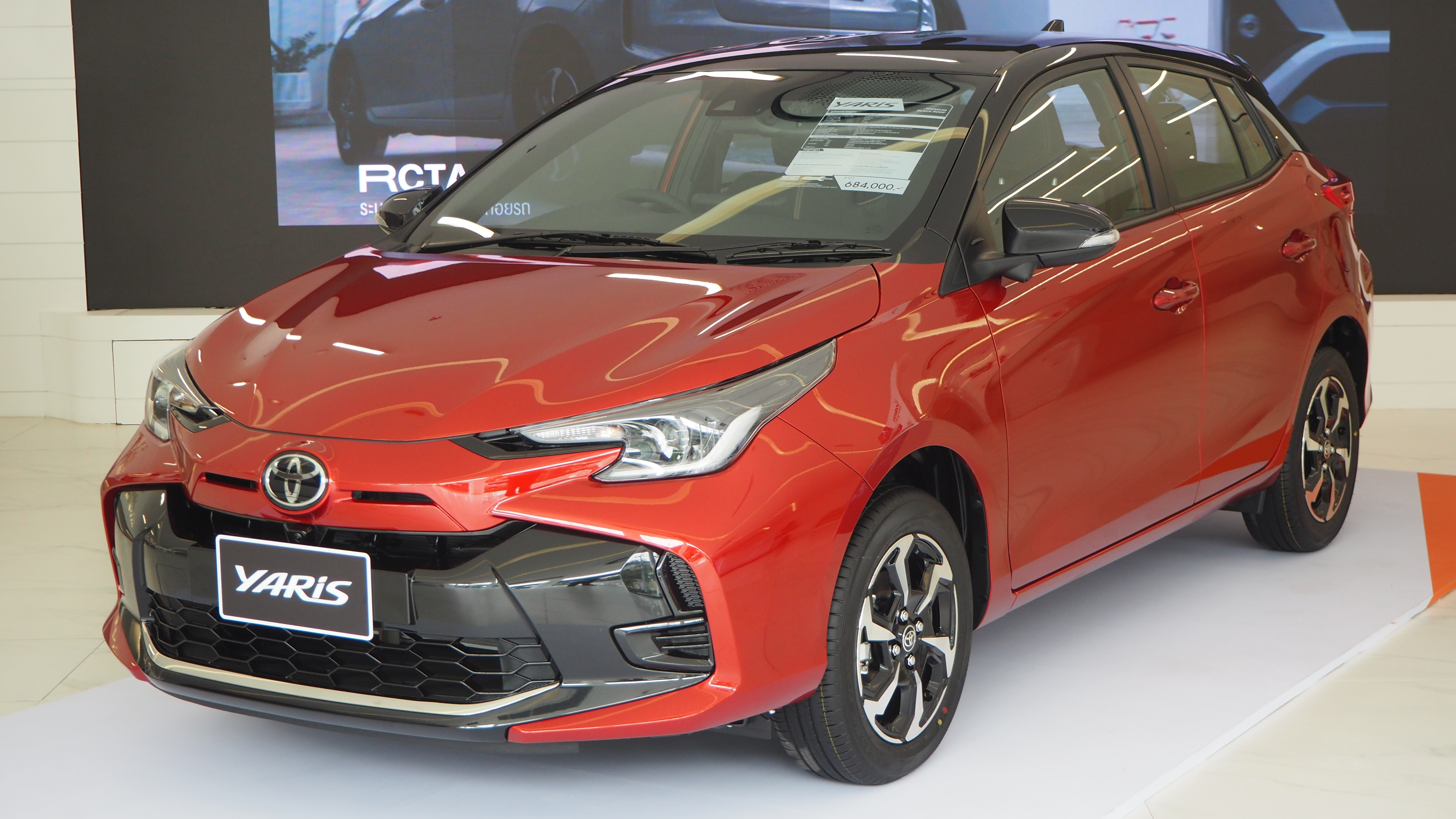
Toyota Yaris (XP150)

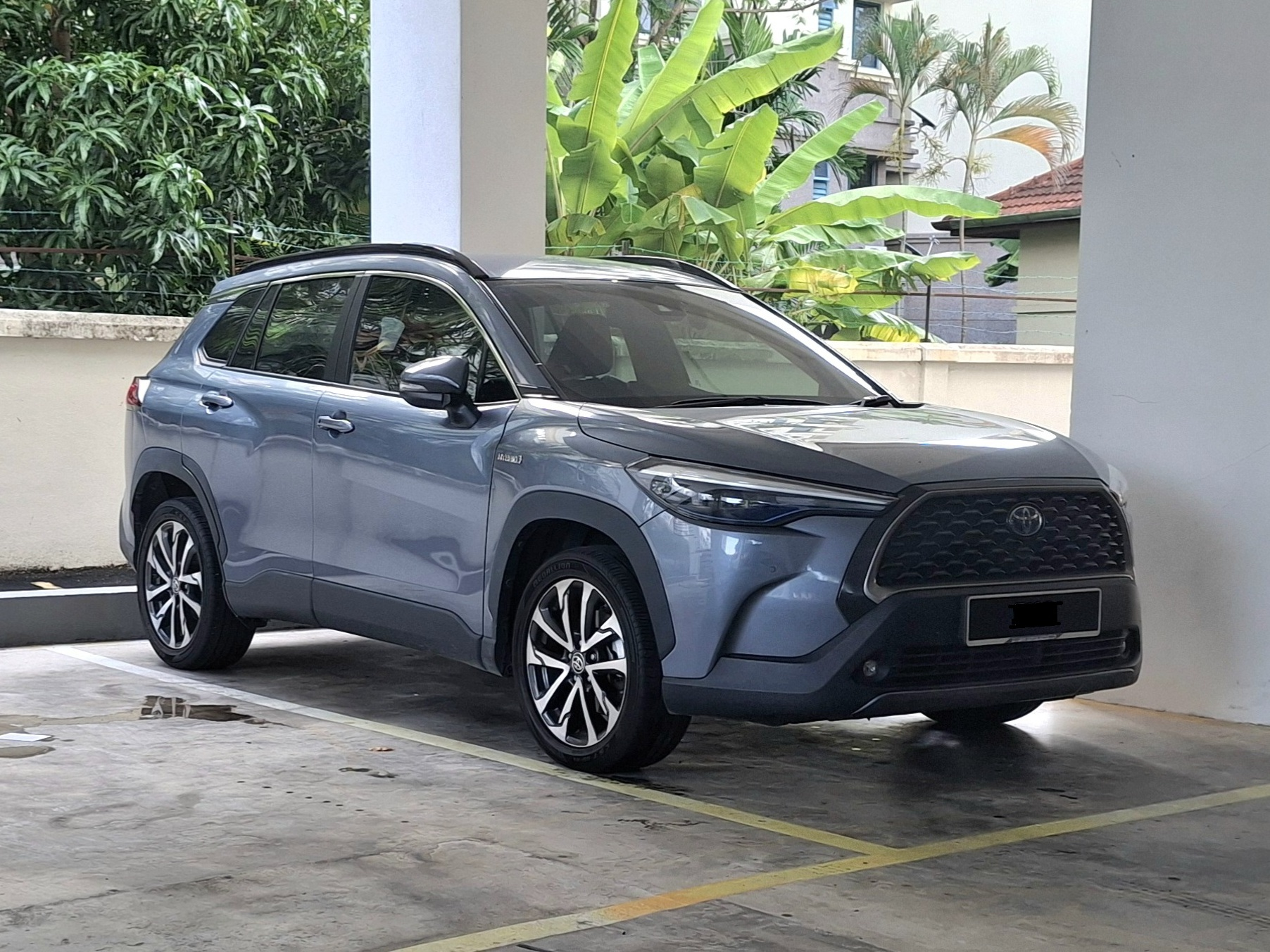
Toyota Corolla Cross Hybrid (XG10)

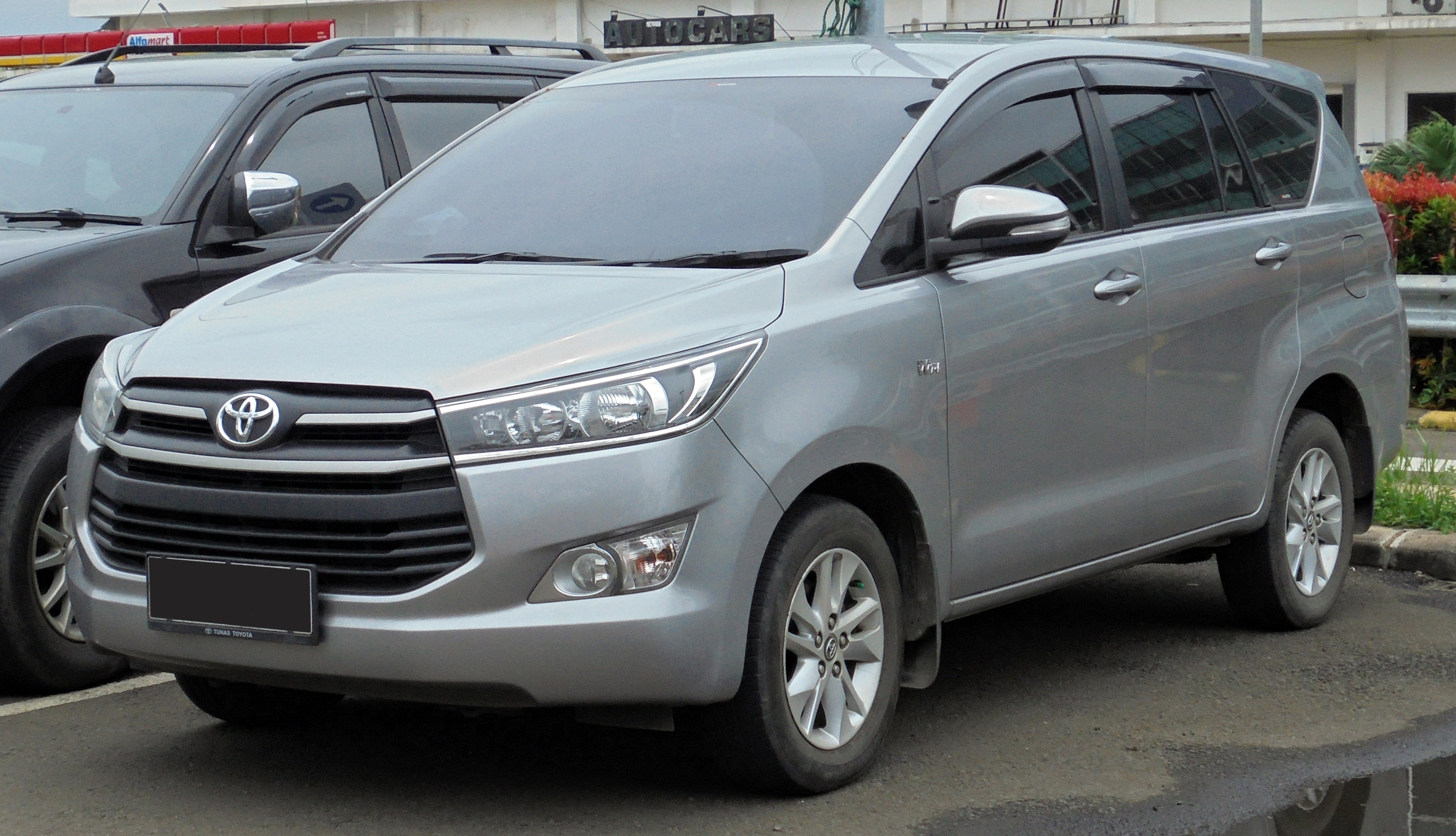
Toyota Innova (AN140)

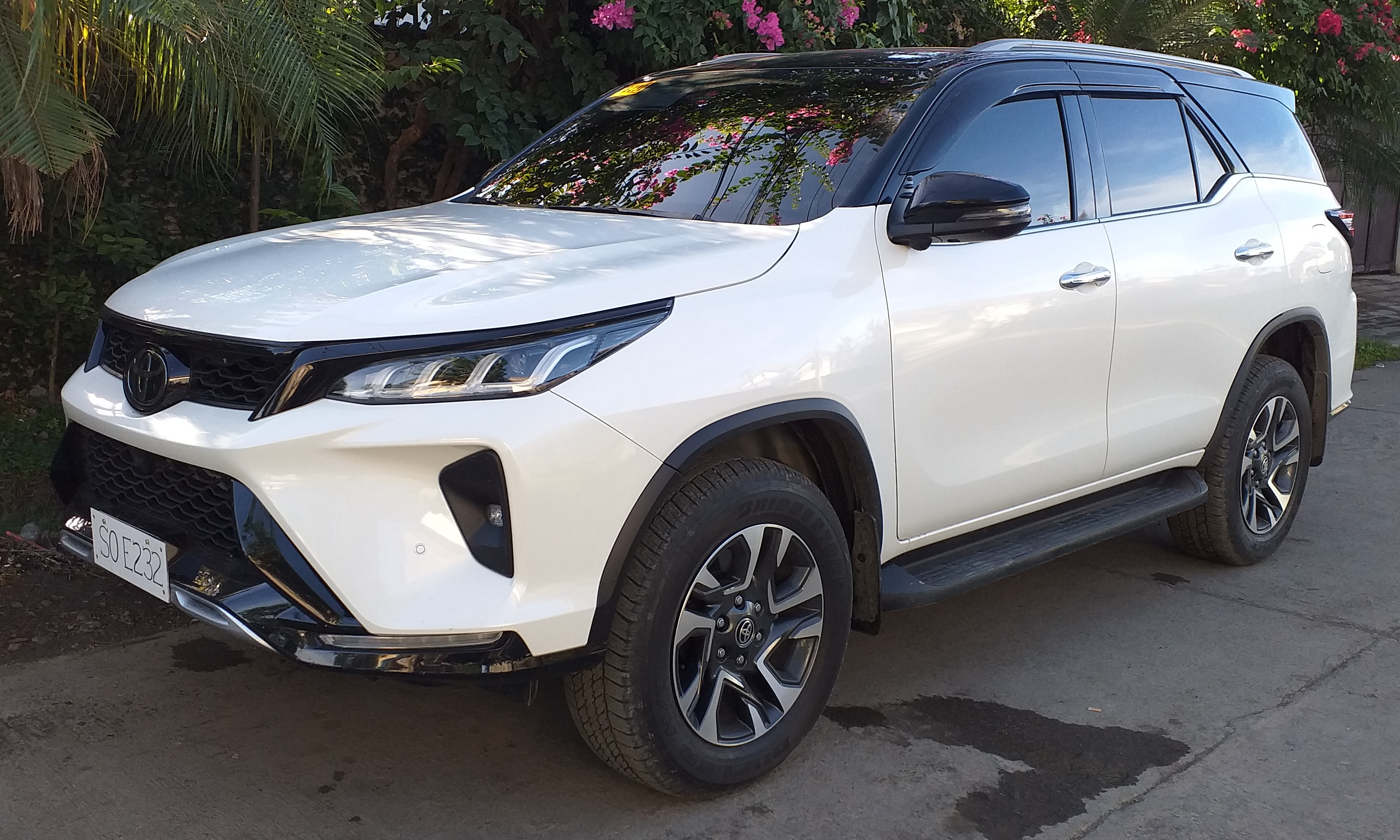
Toyota Fortuner (AN160)

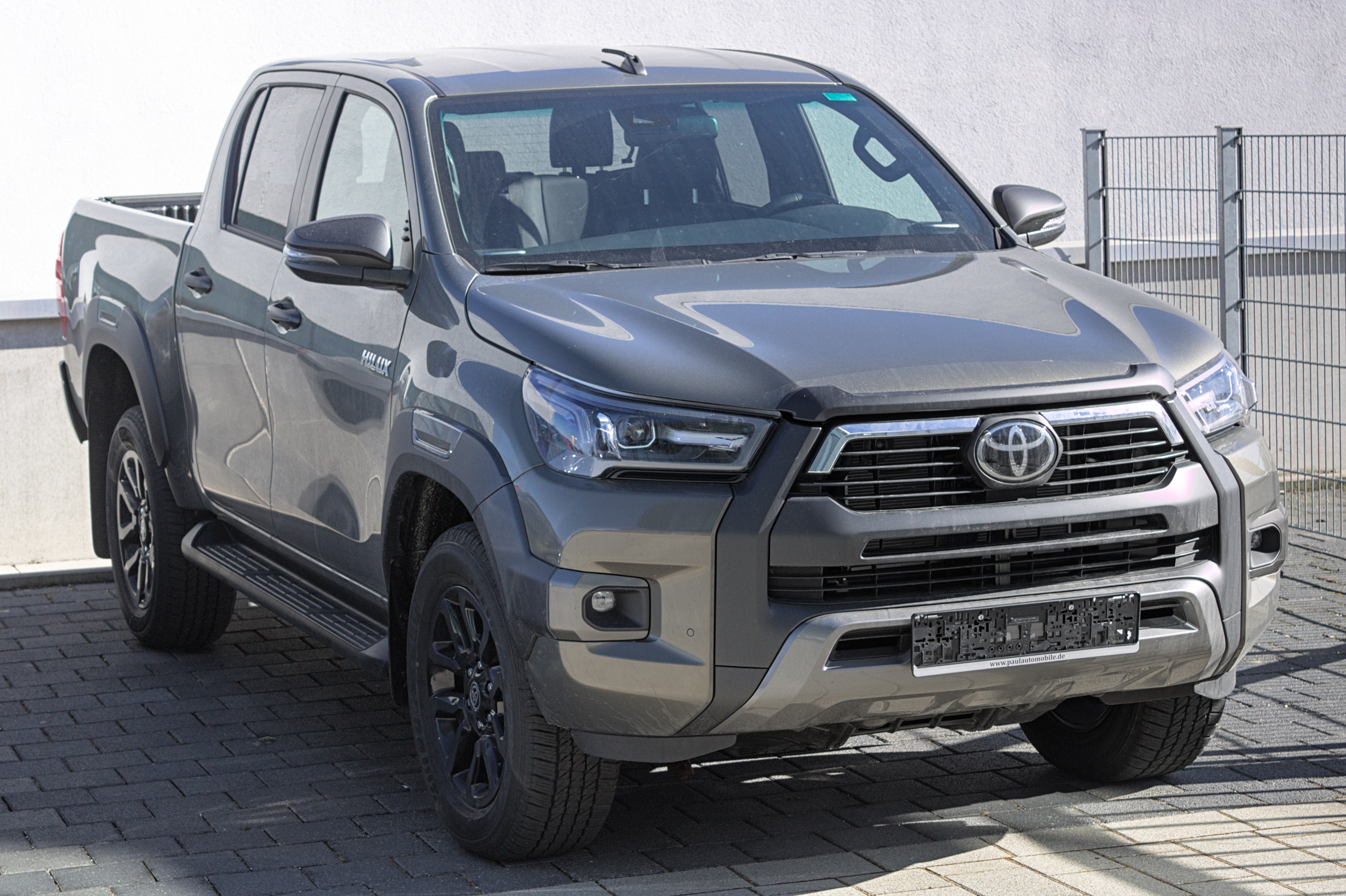
Toyota Hilux (AN130)

== See also ==
- Toyota Motor Corporation
- Toyota Tsusho
- UMW Holdings
