= Rumman Chowdhury =

Data scientist, AI specialist (b. April 1980)

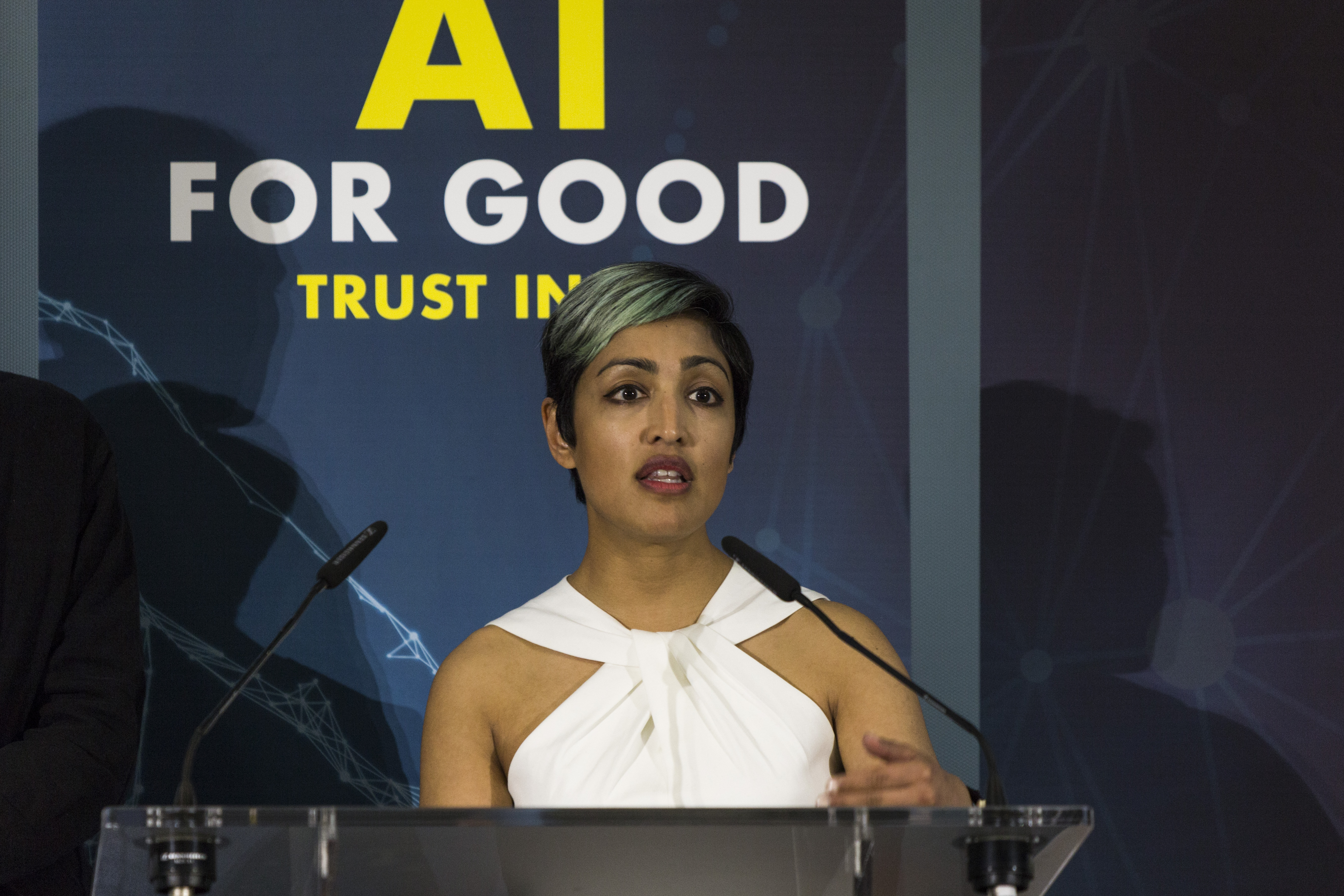
- Rumman Chowdhury at the AI for Good Global Summit 2018
- Born: April 1, 1980 (age 46); Rockland County, New York
- Education: Massachusetts Institute of Technology; Columbia University; University of California, San Diego (PhD)
- Awards: BBC 100 Women (2017) TIME 100/AI (2023) One of Five Who are Shaping AI (Forbes) (2018) Bay Area's top 40 under 40 (San Francisco Business Times) (2018) Inducted to the British Royal Society of the Arts (RSA)
- Scientific career
- Fields: Ethical Artificial Intelligence
- Workplaces: Accenture
- Thesis: Beating Plowshares into Swords: The Impact of the Metropolitan-Military Complex (2017)
- Doctoral advisor: Thaddeus Kousser; Steven Erie
- Website: rummanchowdhury.com

Rumman Chowdhury (b. April 1980) is a Bangladeshi American data scientist, a business founder, and former responsible artificial intelligence lead at Accenture. She was born in Rockland County, New York. She is recognized for her contributions to the field of data science.

Chowdhury's engagement with science was motivated by her enthusiasm for science fiction, a passion that stimulated her curiosity, often attributed to the "Dana Scully Effect." According to Chowdhury, this laid the foundation for her future endeavors.

== Education ==
Chowdhury completed her undergraduate study in Management Science and Political Science at Massachusetts Institute of Technology. She received a Master of Science from Columbia University in Statistics and Quantitative methods. She holds a Doctorate Degree in Political Science from University of California, San Diego. She finished her PhD whilst working in Silicon Valley. Her main interest for her career and higher educational studies was how data can be used to understand people's bias and ways to evaluate the impact of technology on humanity.

== Career ==
=== Early ===
Chowdhury taught data science at the boot camp Metis and worked at Quotient before joining Accenture in 2017. She led their work on responsible artificial intelligence. She was concerned about algorithmic bias and the AI workforce; particularly on retaining researchers. She has spoken openly about the need to define what ethical AI actually means and was responsible for coining the term "moral outsourcing". She works with companies on developing ethical governance and algorithms that explain their decisions transparently. She is determined to use AI to improve diversity in recruitment.

Chowdhury, alongside a team of early career researchers at the Alan Turing Institute, developed a Fairness Tool which scrutinises the data that is input to an algorithm and identifies whether certain categories (such as race or gender) may influence the outcome. The tool both identifies and tries to fix bias, enabling organisations to make fairer decisions.

=== All.ai, Parity and X Institute ===
Chowdhury designed All.ai, a language analysis tool that can monitor and improve the gender balance of speakers in meetings.

In 2020, she founded Parity to bridge the translation gap between risk, legal, and data teams.

She launched the X Institute, a program which teaches refugees about data science and marketing.

She has given a keynote speech at Slush, talking about augmenting human capabilities. She delivered a TED talk about humanity in the age of artificial intelligence.

=== Twitter ===
From February 2021 to November 2022 Chowdhury was a director for the Machine Learning Ethics, Transparency and Accountability (META) team with Twitter. META's goal was to study and improve the machine learning systems used within Twitter, this included biased algorithms which may cause harm to the user. Biased algorithms have been an issue for a long time in the tech industry; traits such as gender, sex, race, or social class hold potential segregation that may result in unfair decisions. META strived to avoid this by making Twitter better, fair, accountable, and more transparent for its users. Most projects that META teams worked on involved research and data analysis, and the team was largely made up of professors, researchers, and engineers. In 2021, Chowdhury and the META team published an analysis titled Examining algorithmic amplification of political content on Twitter. In November 2022, Chowdhury was one of many Twitter employees who were laid off at short notice after Elon Musk's takeover of the company.

== Awards ==
In 2017, she was included in the 100 Women (BBC) in the "Glass Ceiling Team" category. In 2018, she was named one of five people who are shaping AI by Forbes. She was acknowledged by The Business Journals as one of the Bay Area's top 40 Under 40. She has also been inducted into the British Royal Society of the Arts (RSA) to celebrate people who have made progress in social challenges.
