= Badrul Feisal Abdul Rahim =

Malaysian business executive (1969–2020)

- بدرول فيعيسىل عبدالرحيم
- Born: 6 July 1969; Kuala Lumpur, Malaysia
- Died: 31 May 2020 (aged 50); Kuala Lumpur, Malaysia
- Education: University of Missouri
- Occupations: Businessman, President, Chairman and CEO of UMW Holdings

Badrul Feisal bin Abdul Rahim (6 July 1969 – 31 May 2020) was a Malaysian business executive. He was chairman and chief executive officer of UMW Holdings from 2015 to 2020.

== Education ==
Badrul Feisal held a Bachelor of Science in Accounting at the University of Missouri in Columbia, United States and an American Associate Degree (AAD) in Accounting at MARA College of Science.

== Career ==
Badrul Feisal joined UMW as senior general manager at the President's Office and group chief executive officer in December 2010 and was appointed executive director of the UMW Oil and Gas Division from April 2011 to December 2011. He also served as executive director of the group's Corporate Development Division before being appointed as head of UMW Group Operations in January 2013.

He was also involved in senior management and directors at several companies such as Khazanah Nasional, Proton, Lotus and DRB-HICOM.

Badrul Feisal was appointed president and CEO of UMW on 1 October 2015 replacing Syed Hisham Syed Wazir whose contract expired.

He held the position of associate professor at the Center for Manufacturing Engineering Learning, University of Perlis, and was a member of the University of Kuala Lumpur UniKL Industry Advisory Board.

== Death ==
Badrul Feisal died on 31 May 2020 at KPJ Ampang Puteri Hospital due to a heart attack.

After his death, he was succeeded by Azmin Che Yusoff as the acting president and CEO effective 5 June 2020.

Business positions
Preceded by Syed Hisham Syed Wazir	President and Chief Executive Officer of UMW Holdings Berhad; 1 October 2015 – 31 May 2020	Succeeded by Azmin Che Yusoff (Acting)
