= Badrul Islam Ali Khan =

Badrul Islam Ali Khan was a barrister in Amritsar, Punjab, during British rule in India. On 19 April 1919, shortly after the Jallianwala Bagh massacre, he was arrested after being named by the approver, Hans Raj. He was accused of organising meetings at Jallianwala Bagh, to demand the release of Satyapal and Saifuddin Kitchlew, who had spoken out about the impact of the Rowlatt Act on Indians. He was later found not guilty and acquitted.

== Personal and family ==
Khan married Violet Love, and they had three daughters; Helen Leila and Phyllis. Helen was married to the diplomat Chaman Lall; Leila was married to the renowned 13th Chief Justice of India, Justice Sikri and Phyllis was married to Mirza Anwar Abdul Qadir, eldest son of Sir Zafar Ali Abdul Qadir of Lahore, Chief Justice of Punjab and Mutawalli of the Wazir Khan Mosque.
