= Kamal Quadir =

Bangladeshi-American entrepreneur and artist

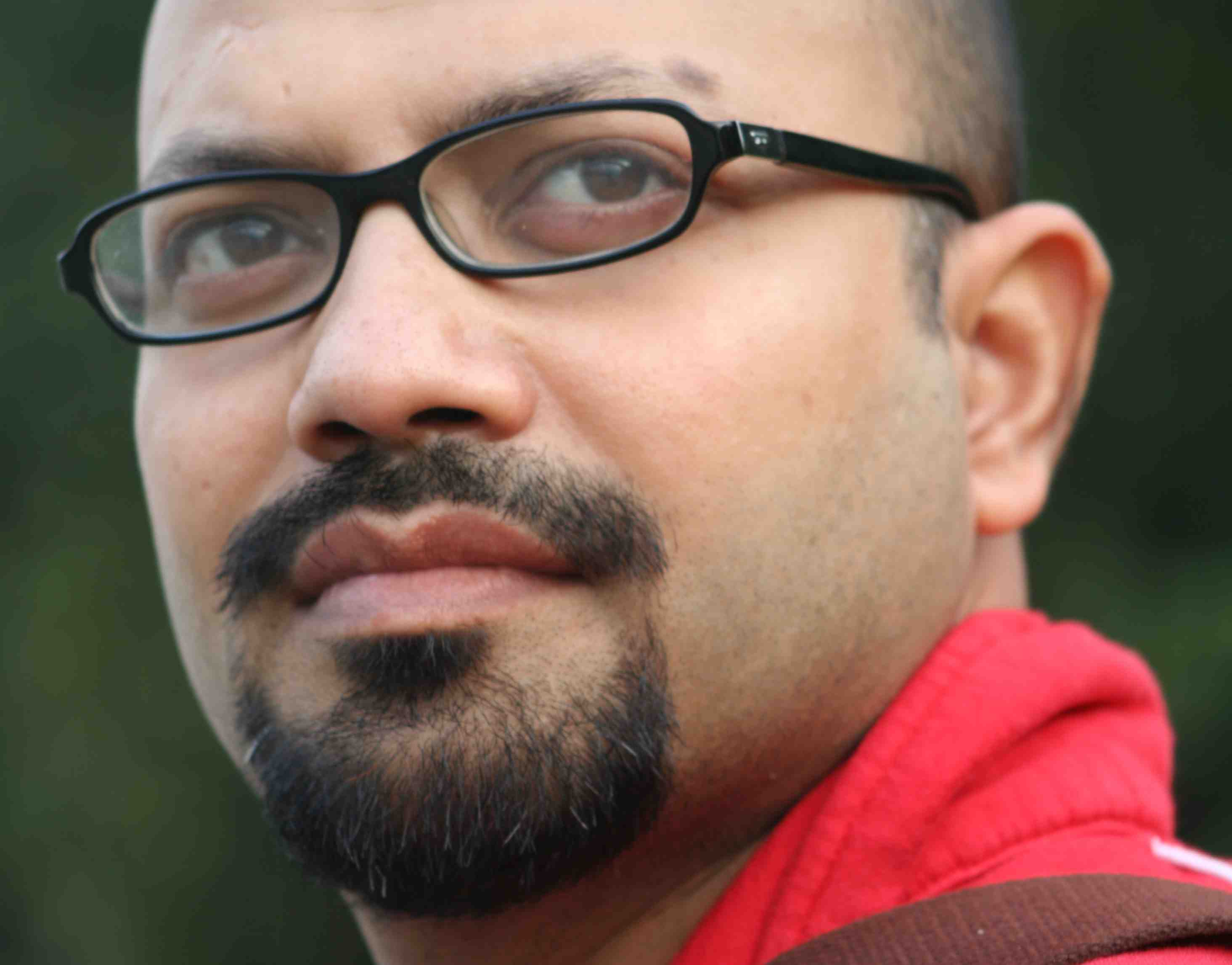
- Qaudir in 2007–2008
- Born: 1971 (age 54–55)
- Education: Oberlin College; MIT Sloan School of Management
- Occupation: CEO of bKash Limited
- Known for: Founder of bKash
- Relatives: Iqbal Quadir (brother) Khalid Quadir (brother)

Kamal Quadir (born 1971) is a Bangladeshi American entrepreneur and artist best known for introducing e-commerce in Bangladesh by founding CellBazaar, an electronic marketplace which, after reaching 4 million users, was acquired by Norwegian telecommunications operator Telenor in 2010. CellBazaar later was rebranded as ekhanei.com. He is the brother of Iqbal Quadir, who is an entrepreneur and promoter of the role of entrepreneurship and innovation in creating prosperity in low-income countries.

Quadir founded bKash in 2010, which provides financial services through a network of community-based agents and existing technology, including mobile phones. bKash serves 84 million verified customers in Bangladesh.

Quadir is a founding member of Open World Initiatives, a Lausanne, Switzerland-based organization of young thinkers. He is involved with Anwarul Quadir Foundation which recognises innovations in developing countries. The Aspen Institute selected him for Finance Leaders Fellowship as one of the global high-impact leaders in finance in 2023 . In 2009, TED selected Quadir a TED Fellow and the World Economic Forum recognised him as a Young Global Leader.

== Early life ==
Quadir was an intern at Insight Venture Partners in New York, led the Business Development Division of Occidental Petroleum's initiative in Bangladesh and worked for New York City's Chamber of Commerce. He was also the co-founder and creative director of GlobeKids Inc., an animation company.

Quadir completed a BA at Oberlin College and MBA at the MIT Sloan School of Management.

He is also an artist whose works are in the permanent collection of the Bangladesh National Museum and the Liberation War Museum.

== Awards ==
- 2005: MIT Ideas Award
- 2007: Tech Award for "Applying Technology to Benefit Humanity"
- 2008: Global Mobile Award of the GSM Association in the category of "Best Use of Mobile for Social & Economic Development"
  - Telecom Asia's "Asian Innovation of the Year" Award
  - India's Manthan Award for "Best E-Content for Development"
- 2009: Young Global Leader (YGL) - World Economic Forum of Davos
- 2015: Social Entrepreneur of the Year - Schwab Foundation's
- 2016: Distinguished Achievement Award - Oberlin Alumni Awards
- 2021: ICT Business person of the year - The Daily Star ICT Awards 2021
- 2021: Best E-cash/money & CSR award, exceptional contribution to the welfare of people during the Covid period - Global Business CSR Awards
- 2023: Lifetime Achievement Award - ICT Ministry
- 2023: Global high-impact leaders in finance - 2023 Class of its Finance Leaders Fellows
- 2023: Entrepreneur of the Year - Bangladesh C-Suite Awards 2023
- 2023: The Aspen Institute selected him for Finance Leaders Fellowship as one of the global high-impact leaders in finance
- 2025: ICT Business Person of the Year - 10th BRAC Bank-The Daily Star ICT Awards.

== See also ==
- Grameenphone
- Mobile Telecommunications
- Omidyar Network
- Alex Pentland
