= Badrul Khan =

American author and educator

Badrul Huda Khan (Bengali: বদরুল হুদা খান) is an American author and educator who focuses on web-based training and educational technology. Badrul Khan recognized the potential of the World Wide Web for education early in 1996, and was invited to keynote the NAU/web98 conference, sponsored by Northern Arizona University. Khan first coined the phrase "Web-based instruction" in his 1997 book Web-Based Instruction. He contributed to the development of US virtual education policies organized by the White House Office of Science and Technology Policy and the Naval Postgraduate School, the National Educational Technology Plan by the US Department of Education and the Review of Joint Professional Military Education organized by the Joint Chiefs of Staff. He is a past president of the International Division of the Association for Educational and Communication Technology (AECT). Khan is a United States Distance Learning Association (USDLA) Hall of Fame Inductee.

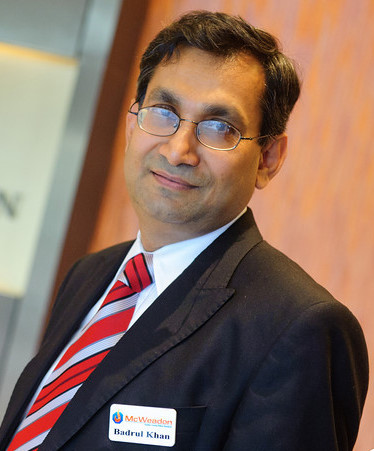
Badrul Khan

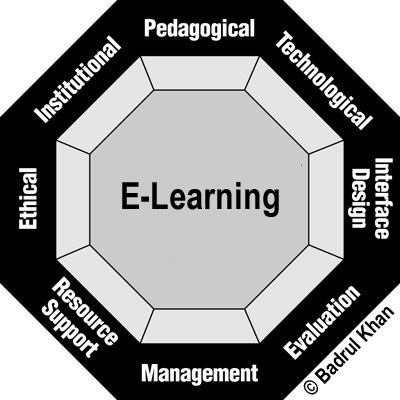
E-Learning Framework by Khan

== Writing ==
His second book, Web-based Training, was published by Educational Publications in 2001. Other books include Managing E-Learning Strategies and E-Learning Quick Checklist. His 2007 book Flexible Learning in an Information Society includes case studies, design models, strategies, and critical issues encompassing the multiple dimensions of his E-Learning Framework. He also developed E-Learning P3 (People-Process-Product) Model and E-Learning Evaluation Model

Khan writes a syndicated column for Educational Technology magazine entitled "Interviews with Badrul Khan", for which he interviews leaders around the world who have implemented e-learning in their regions or institutions.

== Professional experience ==
He was the founding director of the Educational Technology Leadership graduate cohort program in Alexandria and served as professor at The George Washington University. He also served as the founding director and professor of the Educational Technology (ET) graduate program at the University of Texas Brownsville. He served as an Instructional Developer and evaluation specialist at the Indiana University School of Medicine, Indianapolis. He is the founder and president of McWeadon Education (a professional development institution).

== Education and childhood ==
He received a B.A. in chemistry and a Ph.D. in instructional systems technology from Indiana University Bloomington, Indiana.

Badrul Huda Khan was born and grew up in Chittagong, Bangladesh in the 1970s. His father's name is Lokman Khan Sherwani and mother's name is Shabnom Khanam Sherwani.

== Published books ==
- User Interface Design for Virtual Environments: Challenges and Advances (Premier Reference Source)
- Web-Based Instruction, Educational Technology Publications, 1997, ISBN 978-0-87778-297-1
- Web-Based Training, Educational Technology Publications, 2000, ISBN 978-0-87778-302-2
- Managing E-Learning Strategies: Design, Delivery, Implementation and Evaluation, Information Science Publishing, 2005, ISBN 978-1-59140-635-8
- E-learning Quick Checklist, Information Science Publishing, 2005, ISBN 978-1-59140-812-3
- Learning on demand: ADL and the future of e-learning. Washington DC: Department of Defense.
- Flexible Learning in an Information Society, IGI Global, 2007, ISBN 978-1-59904-325-8
- E-learning: progettazione e gestion (Italian)
- استراتيجيات التعلم الالكتروني (Arabic)
- E-러닝 성공전략 (Korean)
- عنوان کتاب : مديريت يادگيري الكترونيكي (Persian)
