= BKash =

Mobile money transfer service

bKash Limited

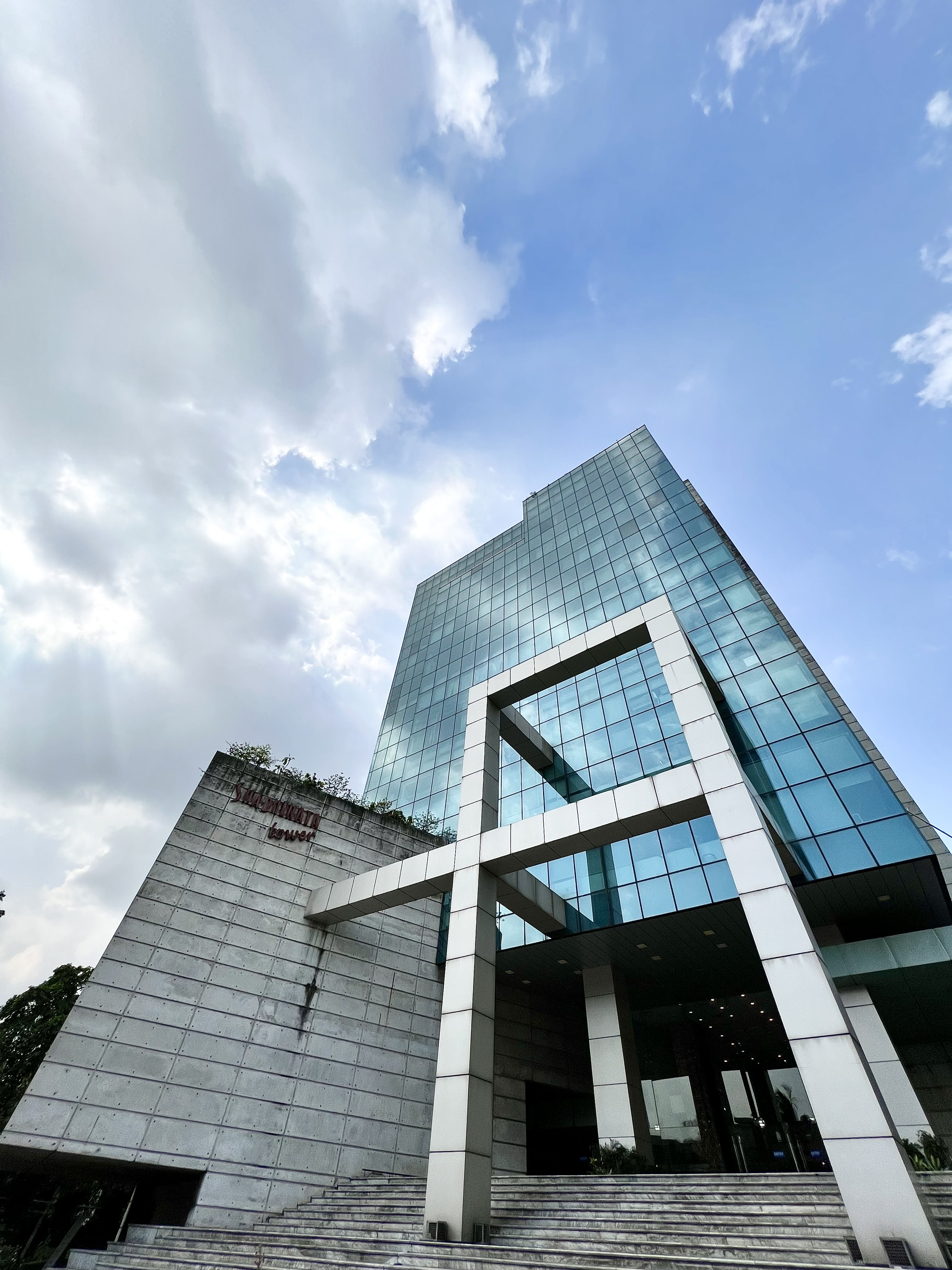
- bKash Corporate Office
- Type: Private
- Founded: 21 July 2011; 15 years ago
- Founder: Kamal Quadir
- Headquarters: Shadhinata Tower, 1, Bir Sreshtha Shaheed Jahangir Gate, Dhaka Cantonment, Dhaka 1206
- Area served: Bangladesh
- Key people: Kamal Quadir (CEO); Shameran Abed (Chairman)
- Services: Mobile financial services
- Parent: BRAC Bank, Ant Financial, Bill & Melinda Gates Foundation, Money in Motion LLC, International Finance Corporation, SoftBank Vision Fund
- Website: bkash.com

bKash Limited (Bengali: বিকাশ d/b/a: bKash) is a mobile financial service (MFS) in Bangladesh operating under the authority of Bangladesh Bank as a subsidiary of BRAC Bank PLC. This mobile financial service company started as a joint venture between BRAC Bank PLC, and Money in Motion LLC.

== History ==
In the mid-2000s, Mobile Financial services, Mobile Service, Internet Service, Value Added Service had taken off in the Philippines, Kenya, and other emerging markets. Considering that in mind, Kamal Quadir and his brother Iqbal Quadir with few like-minded people such as- Nick Hughes founded Money in Motion LLC. They decided to bring Mobile Financial Services to Bangladesh. In need of a local partner, Kamal Quadir began to engage BRAC's founder, Sir Fazle Hasan Abed, in 2008. Discussions between them continued over a two-year period. In 2010, they committed to establishing a joint venture between BRAC Bank PLC and Money in Motion LLC. bKash launched on 21 July 2011 in Bangladesh, with basic services: Cash In, Cash Out and Send Money, keeping in mind that more than 70% of the population of Bangladesh lives in rural areas where access to formal banking services is difficult for people. Currently, bKash is serving more than 84M verified users all across Bangladesh.

In 2026, bKash received initial approval for creating bKash Digital Bank.

=== Funding and shareholding ===
bKash started in 2011 as a joint venture between BRAC Bank PLC and Money in Motion LLC. In April 2013, International Finance Corporation(IFC), a member of the World Bank Group, became an equity partner. In March 2014, Bill & Melinda Gates Foundation (Currently, Gates Foundation) became an investor in the company, and in April 2018 Ant International, the operators of Alipay (an affiliate company of Chinese giant Alibaba Group), became an equity partner, announced a strategic partnership to promote financial inclusion for the unbanked and underbanked communities in Bangladesh. Later, in November 2021, SoftBank Vision Fund II has invested $250 million in bKash, acquiring a significant stake of over 10%. This investment has increased bKash's valuation and become the first ever unicorn startup (a startup whose valuation is $1 billion or more) company in Bangladesh.

== Services ==
As a mobile financial service (MFS) provider in Bangladesh, bKash users can transfer money into their mobile accounts and then access a range of services. In particular, transferring and receiving money domestically and making payments. Services like mobile recharge (prepaid and postpaid package), internet service, value added service and paying utility bills are also possible through bKash USSD (*247#) and App. bKash is a comprehensive personal finance platform offers more than 200 services including remittance, digital nano-loans, savings schemes and insurance.

=== bKash App ===
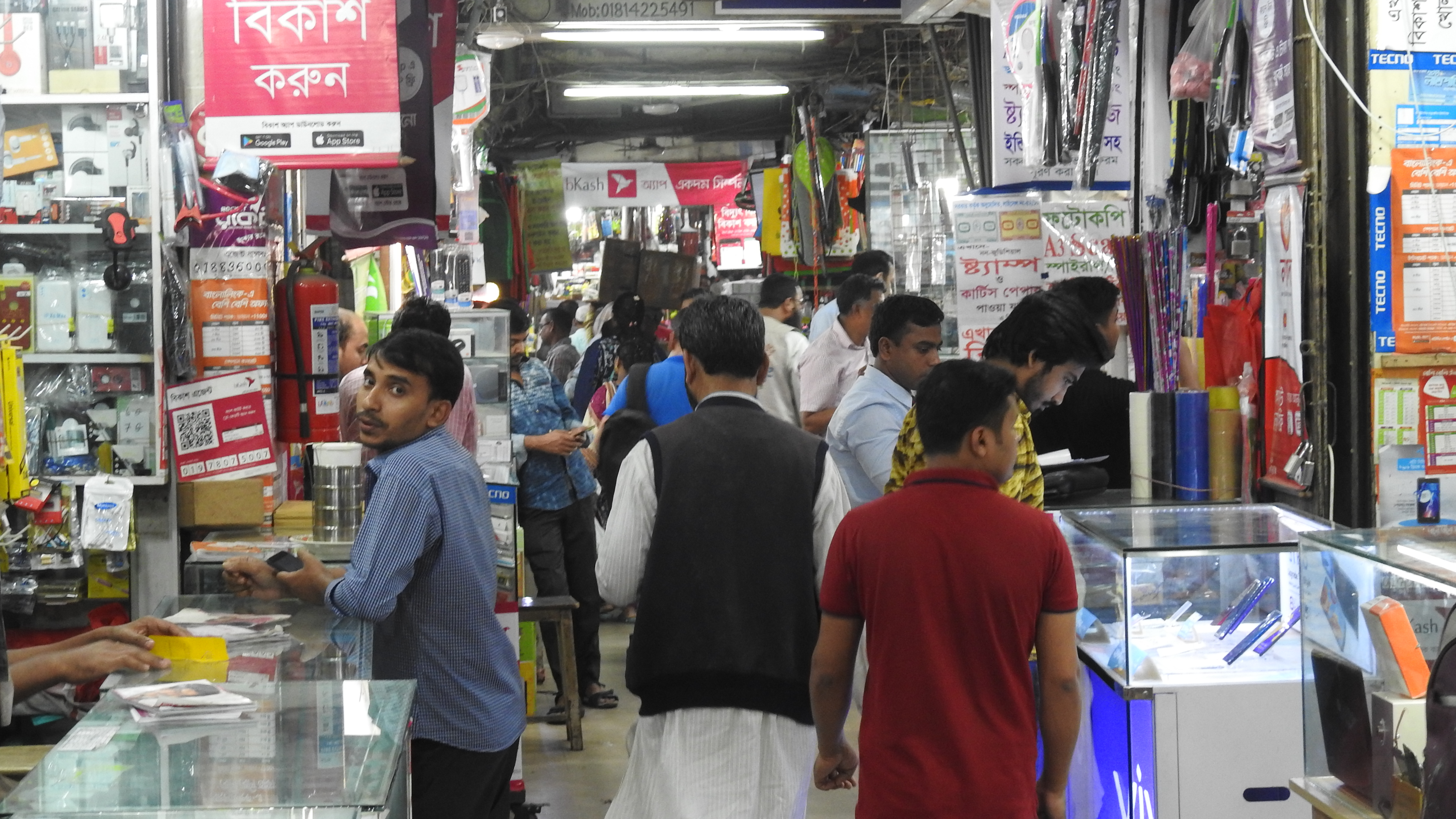
A bkash agent shop at Gulshan 1, Dhaka, Bangladesh.

bKash has become an integral part of Bangladeshi daily life, revolutionizing the country's financial landscape. The mobile financial service (MFS) app offers a wide range of features, from sending and receiving money to paying bills and availing loans. Launched in 2018, bKash quickly gained popularity due to its convenience, security, and regulated transactions. The app's user-friendly interface and diverse services have made it accessible to millions. It has been recognized as the best innovation at the Financial Innovation Category in Bangladesh Innovation Award 2018 for its simplified and useful features.

== Recognition ==
Fortune magazine ranked bKash 23rd among the top 50 companies in their Change the World list in 2017. Asiamoney magazine declared bKash as the Best Digital Solution.
