= Iqbal Quadir =

Bangladeshi American entrepreneur (born 1958)

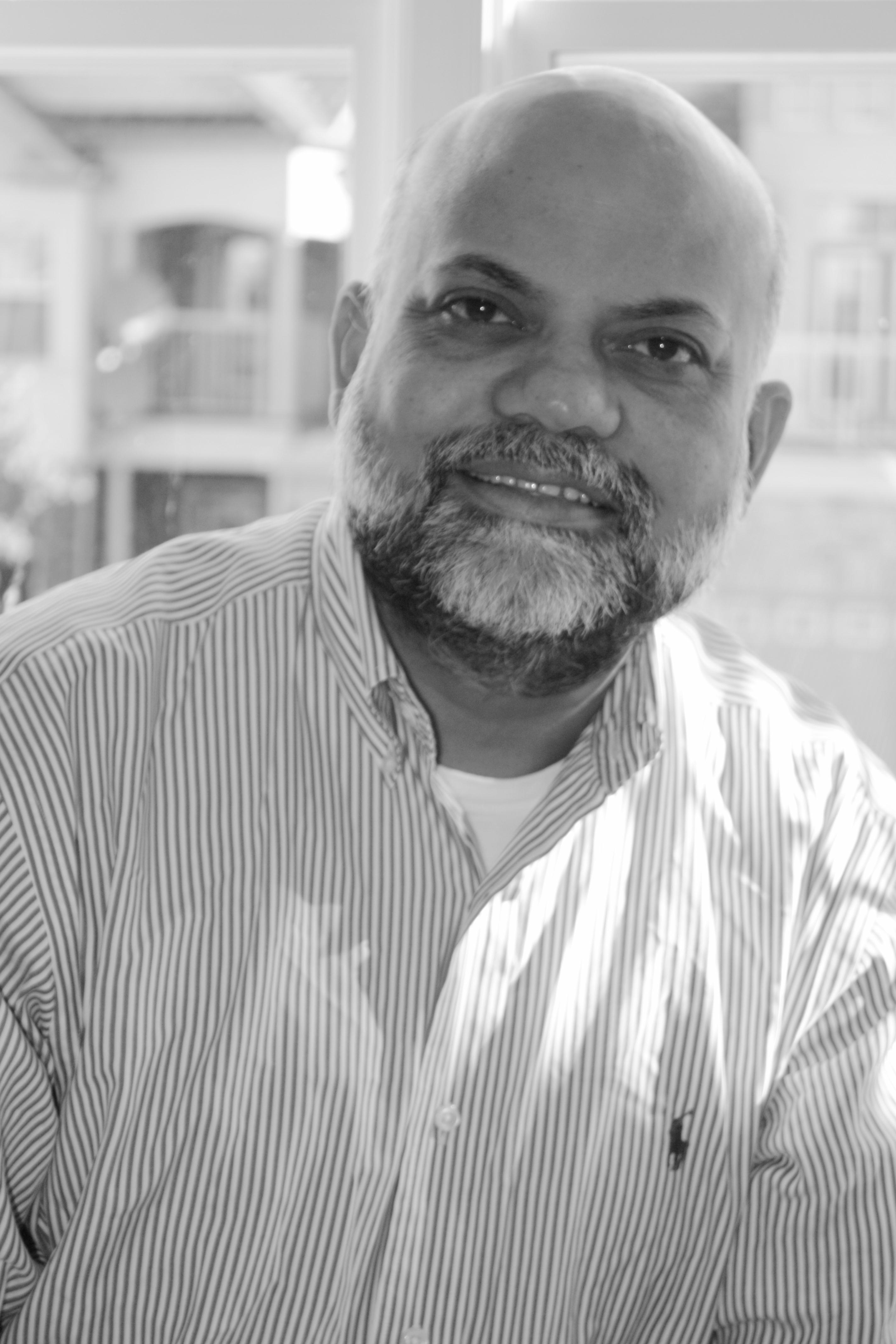
- Born: August 13, 1958 (age 67); Jessore, Bangladesh
- Education: Swarthmore College (BS); University of Pennsylvania (MA, MBA)
- Known for: Founder of Grameenphone
- Relatives: Kamal Quadir (Brother)

Iqbal Quadir (born 13 August 1958) (Bengali: ইকবাল জেড. কাদীর) is a Bangladeshi-American entrepreneur and academic, known for founding the telecommunications company Grameenphone and for his work on development-oriented technology initiatives.

In the 1990s, Quadir initiated and helped establish Grameenphone, a mobile telecommunications company in Bangladesh that expanded telephone access beyond urban centers. According to The Economist, Quadir is described as an early participant in the global mobile telecommunications expansion, noting his focus on mobile device usage in low-income regions.

He served as a Research Fellow at the Harvard Kennedy School of Government for four years, where he conducted research on how emerging technologies influence governance and economic development in low- and middle-income countries. In 2007, he established the Legatum Center for Development and Entrepreneurship at MIT and serves as its director. In 2006, he co-founded the journal Innovations (published by MIT Press) and remains an editor.

== Early life and education ==
Quadir was born in Jessore, Bangladesh. He moved to the United States in 1976 and later became a naturalized U.S. citizen. He completed his Secondary School Certificate from Jhenidah Cadet College, Bangladesh.

Quadir received a Bachelor of Science with honors from Swarthmore College (1981), followed by a Master of Arts (1983), and a Master of Business Administration (1987), the final two from the Wharton School of the University of Pennsylvania.

His brother, Kamal Quadir, is also a Bangladeshi-American entrepreneur and artist.

== Career ==
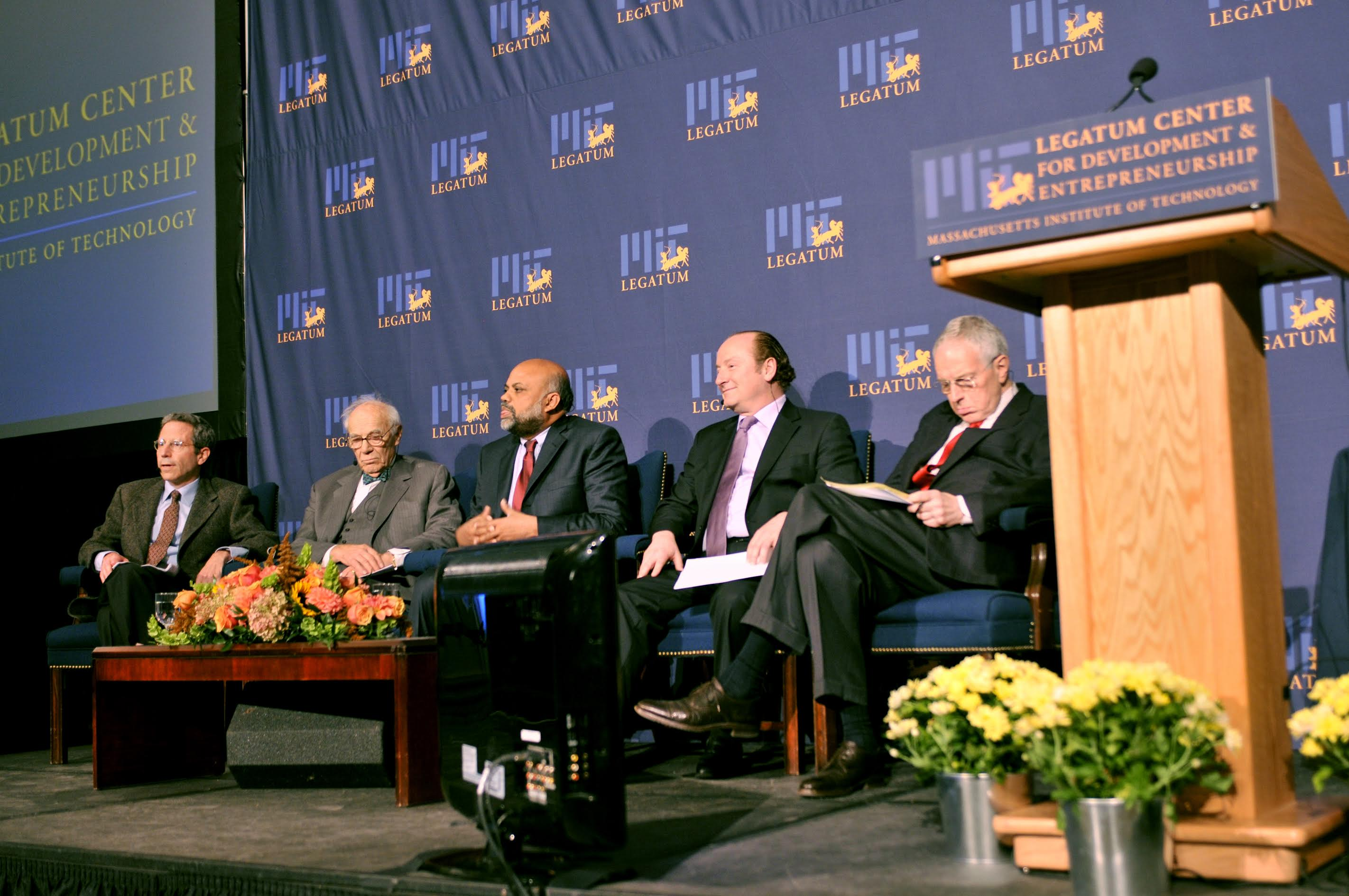
Five Nobel Laureates in Economics graced the inauguration of the Legatum Center in 2008. There was a panel discussion moderated by Quadir that involved four laureates. From left to right, Eric Maskin, Lawrence Klein, moderator Quadir, Robert Merton and Edmund Phelps.

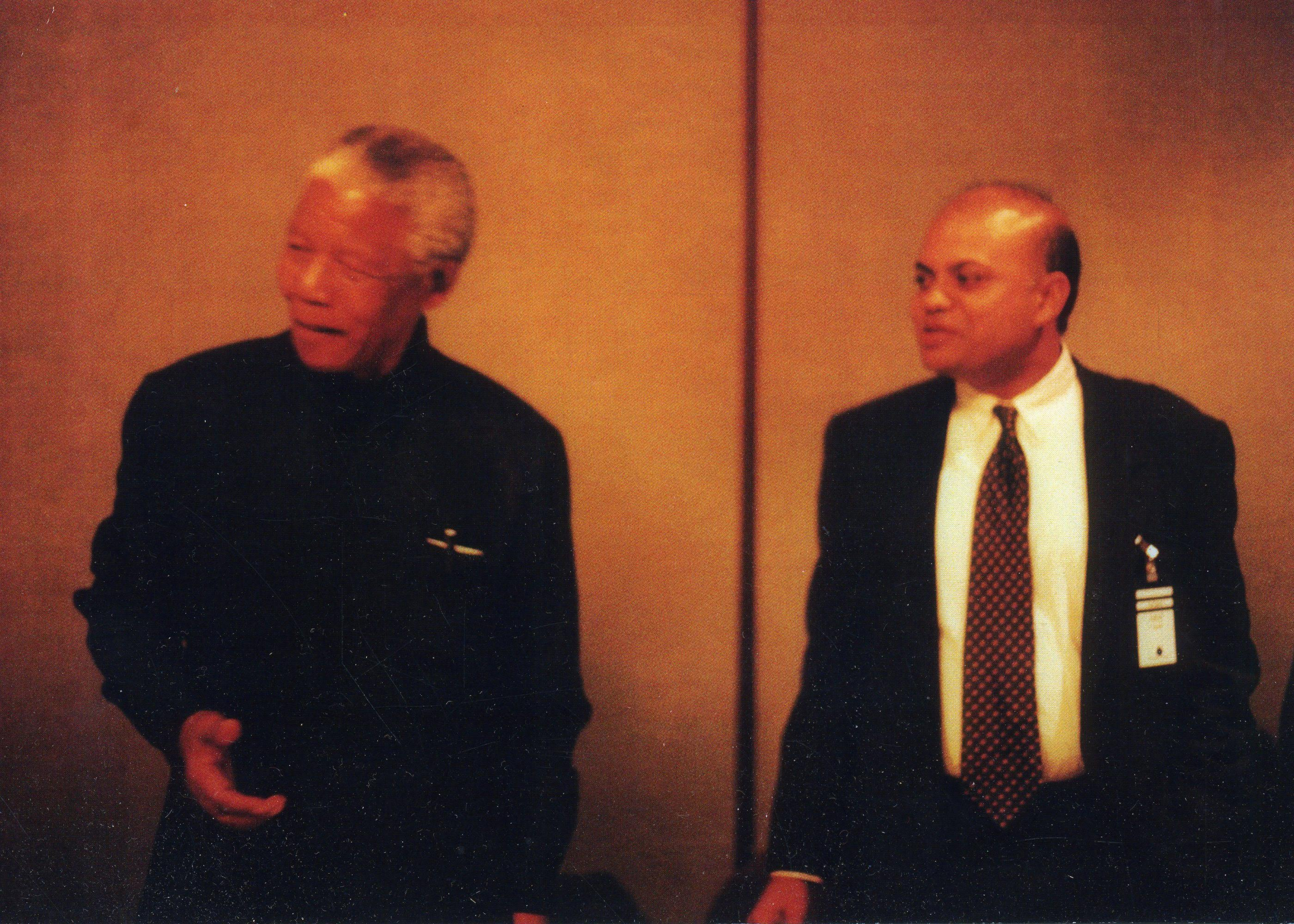
Quadir after a dinner meeting with Nelson Mandela in 2000 in the Carter Center in Atlanta.

Quadir served as a consultant to the World Bank in Washington, D.C. (1983–1985), an associate at Coopers & Lybrand (1987–1989), an associate at Security Pacific Merchant Bank (1989–1991), and vice president of Atrium Capital Corporation (1991–1993).

In 1993, Quadir began efforts to broaden mobile telephone access in rural Bangladesh by integrating telecommunications deployment with microfinance and local enterprise partnerships. As part of this effort, he founded a New York-based company called Gonofone. (Bengali for "phones for the masses"). Then, he organized a global consortium including Norway's Telenor telecommunications; an affiliate of micro-credit pioneer Grameen Bank in Bangladesh; Marubeni Corp. in Japan; Asian Development Bank in the Philippines; Commonwealth Development Corporation in the United Kingdom; and International Finance Corporation and Gonofone in the United States. The initiative aimed to provide telecommunications access through a model in which village entrepreneurs, supported by micro-loans, offered phone services in their local areas. Economist Jeffrey Sachs praised the Grameenphone initiative for demonstrating the potential of telecom expansion in low-income regions.

From 2001 to 2005, Quadir served as a Fellow at Harvard's Kennedy School and taught graduate-level courses on technology in developing countries. At the same time, he was also a Fellow at the Center for Business Innovation at Cap Gemini Ernst & Young (now Capgemini).

In 2005, Quadir went to MIT. In 2007, he started the Legatum Center for Development and Entrepreneurship, which offers resources and programming to MIT students focused on entrepreneurship in developing countries. Quadir is no longer associated with the Legatum Center.

Quadir coined the phrase 'invisible leg' to describe how technological innovations change economies in terms of the distribution of economic and political influence.

To apply his development approach to electricity production in Bangladesh—where 70% of the population does not have access to the national electricity grid—Quadir founded Emergence BioEnergy, Inc., in 2006. This project and another one (namely, removing arsenic from water) were featured in an article titled "Power to the people" in the 9 March 2006 issue of The Economist. In 2007, Emergence BioEnergy won a Wall Street Journal Asian Innovation Award. After a decade of working on developing these projects, he became dissatisfied and shut them down.

== Current projects ==
In 2009, Quadir and his brother Kamal were among the cofounders of Money in Motion, LLC which provided the risk capital to bKash, a mobile financial services provider in Bangladesh with more than 82 million verified users.

In 2004, he and his siblings founded the Anwarul Quadir Foundation to promote innovations in Bangladesh. In 2006, the foundation established a $25,000 global essay competition, the Quadir Prize, through the Center for International Development at Harvard University. In October 2007, the foundation made its first award to two recipients. In April 2009, Stephen Honan developed a method to extract arsenic from water and soil, which won the Quadir Prize in 2009.

== Recognition ==
In 1999, Quadir was selected for the World Economic Forum's Global Leader for Tomorrow program. In 2006, he received the Science, Education and Economic Development (SEED) Award from the Rotary Club of Metropolitan Dhaka for his work in telecommunications development in Bangladesh. He appeared on CNN and PBS and was profiled in feature articles in the Harvard Business Review (Bottom-Up Economics, Aug 2003, & Breakthrough Ideas for 2004, Feb 2004), Financial Times, The Economist, and The New York Times, and in several books. In the Spring of 2007, The Wharton Alumni Magazine included Quadir in its list of 125 Influential People and Ideas. In 2011, he received the honorary degree of Doctor of Humane Letters from Swarthmore College and the honorary degree of Doctor of Science from Case Western Reserve University.

He serves as the chairman of the judging panel for the Legatum FORTUNE Technology Prize, which awards $1 million to individuals or organizations recognizing initiatives that contribute to technological or economic development in low-income countries.

== See also ==
- List of TED speakers
