= Lokman Khan Sherwani =

Indian politician

- লোকমান খান শেরওয়ানী
- Born: 14 August 1910; Chittagong, East Bengal and Assam, British India
- Died: 27 August 1969 (aged 59)
- Spouse: Shobnom Khanam Sherwani

Lokman Khan Sherwani (14 August 1910 – 27 August 1969) was an activist of the Indian independence movement under the British rule. He was a Bengali poet and journalist. Lokman Khan Sherwani was married to Shobnom Khanam Sherwani, who was also an activist of the anti-British movement.

== Political life ==
He served as the provincial vice-president of the All India Forward Block under its founder Subhas Chandra Bose who continued to call for the full and immediate independence of India from British rule. Sherwani served in many political activities, including (but not limited to):

- Provincial Vice-president of Forward Block
- President, All Bengal Tenant Farmers Committee
- President, All Bengal Tenant Farmers Committee
- President, Bengal Chemicals and Pharmaceuticals Workers Union
- President, Assam Bengal Railmen Union
- Presidential Member of the Bengal Farmers Committee
- Member of All India Farmers' Executive Committee

== Books and Magazines ==
He authored several books including Shaobnom which was dedicated with poetry for Nobel Laureate Rabindra Nath Tagore's birth day 25th Boishak, Rokkhok Vhokok Hole Rokkha Kore Ke, Lokman Bani, Bidrohi Arab, Rupaiton, and Damama.

He served as editor of several Bengali newspapers and weekly magazines.
