= Sime UMW =

Malaysian industrial conglomerate

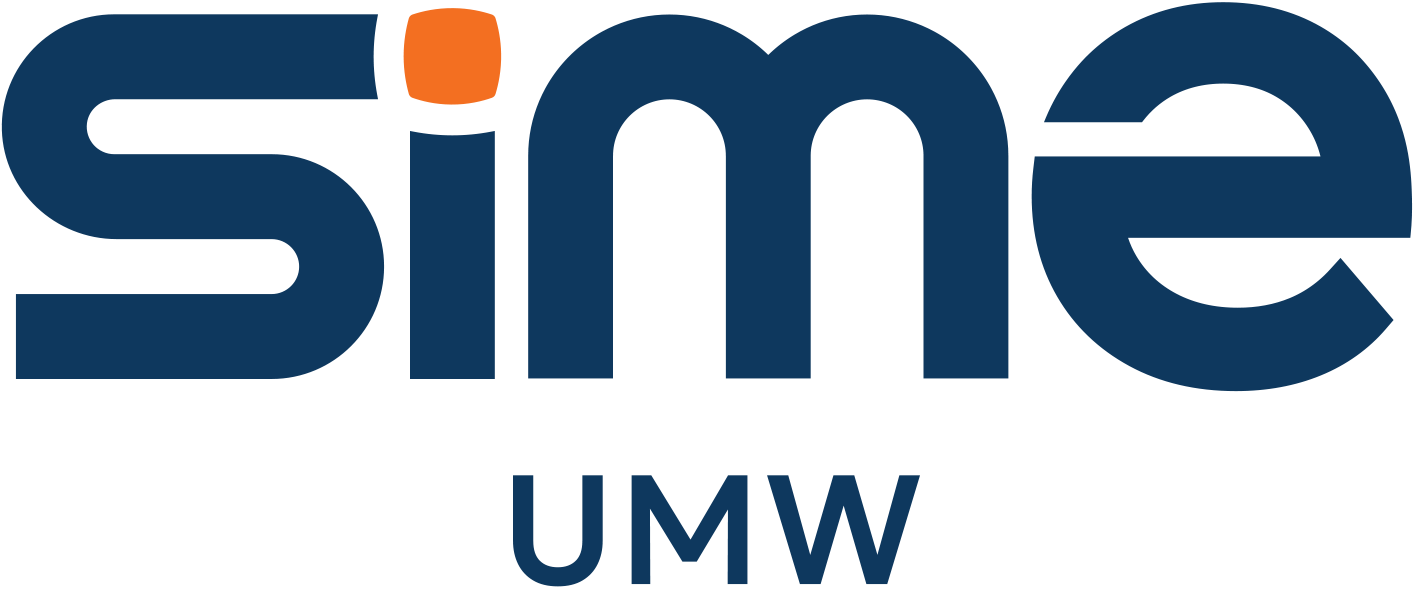
- Formerly: UMW Holdings Berhad
- Type: Subsidiary
- Industry: Automotive, equipment, manufacturing and engineering, aerospace
- Founded: 1917; 109 years ago
- Areas served: Malaysia, Singapore, Brunei, Vietnam, China
- Key people: Mustamir Mohamad (managing director)
- Parent: Sime Darby Berhad (13 Dec 2023–present)
- Subsidiaries: List of subsidiaries
- Website: www.simeumw.com

Sime UMW (formerly known as UMW Holdings Berhad) is a Malaysian industrial conglomerate. It is one of the largest companies and also one of the leading industrial enterprises, serving the economies of Malaysia and the Asia-Pacific region. On 13 December 2023, Sime Darby Berhad announced that it had completed the acquisition of a majority stake (61.2%) in UMW Holdings Berhad, thereby obtaining a controlling interest in the company.

Former logo of UMW Holdings (2000–2024)

Following Sime Darby's rebranding to simply Sime in November 2024, UMW Holdings also rebranded as Sime UMW.

== Subsidiaries ==
=== Automotive ===
- UMW Toyota Motor Sdn. Bhd.
  - Assembly Services Sdn. Bhd.
  - Automotive Industries Sdn. Bhd.
  - Toyota Boshoku UMW Sdn. Bhd.

Associate Company

- Perusahaan Otomobil Kedua Sdn. Bhd. (Perodua)

=== Equipment ===
- UMW Industries (1985) Sdn. Bhd.
- UMW Equipment & Engineering Pte. Ltd.
- UMW Equipment Systems (Vietnam) Company Limited
- UMW Material Handling Shanghai Group, China
  - UMW Industrial Trading (Shanghai) Co. Ltd
  - UMW Industrial Equipment Co. Ltd.
  - Vision Fleet Equipment Leasing (Shanghai) Co. Ltd.
- UMW Industrial Power Services Sdn. Bhd.

=== Manufacturing and engineering ===
- UMW Grantt International Sdn. Bhd. (Grantt)
- UMW Lubricant International Sdn. Bhd. (Repsol)
- UMW Pennzoil Distributors Sdn. Bhd. (Pennzoil)
- Lubetech Sdn. Bhd.
- Lubritech International Holdings Ltd.
- KYB-UMW Malaysia Sdn. Bhd.
- UMW M&E Sdn. Bhd.
- UMW Advantech Sdn. Bhd.

=== Aerospace ===
- UMW Aerospace Sdn. Bhd.
- UMW Aero Assets Sdn. Bhd.
