= Edwin Amenta =

American sociologist

- Born: Chicago, Illinois
- Education: Indiana University Bloomington (AB-1979); Indiana University Bloomington (MA-1982); University of Chicago (PhD-1989)
- Children: Luisa Amenta, Gregory Amenta
- Scientific career
- Fields: Social policy Social movements Political sociology Historical sociology Comparative sociology Sports sociology
- Workplaces: University of California, Irvine
- Doctoral advisor: Theda Skocpol

Edwin Amenta is an American sociologist best known for his study of social policy, social movements and the New Deal.

== Career ==
Through his Political Mediation Theory, developed as a consequence of studying the Townsend Plan, an organization demanding old-age pensions during the Great Depression, and other New Deal-era movements, Amenta has influenced how scholars conceptualize, study, and explain social movement impacts. He is also known for theorizing the role of political institutions in policy-making. Amenta's recent work includes the development of a newspaper coverage database that allows scholars to test theories of social movement impacts across 32 major social movements.

Amenta has written four books and more than 50 articles and book chapters. Bold Relief: Institutional Politics and the Origins of Modern American Social Policy (Princeton University Press, 1998) won the 1999 Distinguished Book award from the American Sociological Association section on Political Sociology. His article “Age for Leisure? Political Mediation and the Impact of the Pension Movement on U.S. Old-Age Policy" (with Neal Caren and Sheera Joy Olasky) won the 2006 Best Published Article Award from the American Sociological Association section on Collective Behavior and Social Movements.

Amenta's other books include When Movements Matter: The Townsend Plan and the Rise of Social Security (Princeton University Press, 2006) and The Wiley-Blackwell Companion to Political Sociology (Wiley-Blackwell, 2012).

Amenta has served as the chair of the American Sociological Association Political Sociology section and Collective Behavior and Social Movements section, and he has received funding from the Russell Sage Foundation and the National Science Foundation.

== Political Mediation Theory ==
Before Amenta, most work on the influence of social movements focused either on the internal characteristics of movements (membership, resources, organization, tactics) or their external environments (openness of the political system, elite alignments and alliances, and state repressive capacities). In his books Bold Relief and When Movements Matter and in a string of articles, Amenta's political mediation model proffers a theory regarding interactions between the internal characteristics of movements and their external environments. Amenta argues that particular movement tactics work better in some contexts than in others, and his empirical work shows interactions between the assertiveness of movement tactics and short-term political contexts. Specifically, when elected officials and state bureaucrats are favorably disposed towards a movement, minimally-assertive tactics will suffice; but when elected officials and state bureaucrats are hostile towards a movement, assertive tactics are necessary. In addition, if elected officials are favorable but state bureaucrats are hostile, or vice versa, movement organizations must target the hostile parties rather than the favorable ones.

== Selected bibliography ==
=== Books ===
- Amenta, Edwin, Kate Nash, and Alan Scott, eds. 2012. The Wiley-Blackwell Companion to Political Sociology. Malden (MA): Wiley-Blackwell.
- Amenta, Edwin. 2007. Professor Baseball: Searching for Redemption and the Perfect Lineup on the Softball Diamonds of Central Park. Chicago: University of Chicago Press.
- Amenta, Edwin. 2006. When Movements Matter: The Townsend Plan and the Rise of Social Security. Princeton: Princeton University Press.
- Amenta, Edwin. 1998. Bold Relief: Institutional Politics and the Origins of Modern American Social Policy. Princeton: Princeton University Press.

=== Articles ===
- Amenta, Edwin. 2014. "How to Analyze the Influence of Movements.” Contemporary Sociology: A Journal of Reviews 43(1), 16–29.
- Amenta, Edwin, Neal Caren, and James E. Stobaugh. 2012. “Political Reform and the Historical Trajectories of U.S. Social Movements in the Twentieth Century.” Social Forces 90(4): 1073–1100.
- Amenta, Edwin, Beth Gharrity Gardner, Amber Celina Tierney, Anaid Yerena, and Thomas Alan Elliott. 2012. “A Story-Centered Approach to the Newspaper Coverage of High-Profile SMOs.” Research in Social Movements, Conflict and Change 33: 83–107.
- Amenta, Edwin, Neal Caren, Sheera Joy Olasky, and James E. Stobaugh. 2009. “All the Movements Fit to Print: Who, What, When, Where, and Why SMOs Appeared in the New York Times in the Twentieth Century.” American Sociological Review 74(4): 636–56.
- Amenta, Edwin, Neal Caren, and Sheera Joy Olasky. 2005. “Age for Leisure? Political Mediation and the Impact of the Pension Movement on Old-Age Policy.” American Sociological Review 70(3): 516–38.
- Amenta, Edwin and Drew Halfmann. 2000. “Wage Wars: Institutional Politics, the WPA, and the Struggle for U.S. Social Policy.” American Sociological Review 65(4): 506–28.
- Amenta, Edwin and Michael P. Young. 1999. “Democratic States and Social Movements: Theoretical Arguments and Hypotheses.” Social Problems 46(2): 153–68.
- Amenta, Edwin, Drew Halfmann, and Michael P. Young. 1999. "The strategies and contexts of social protest: Political mediation and the impact of the Townsend Movement in California." Mobilization: An International Quarterly 4(1):1-23.
- Amenta, Edwin and Jane D. Poulsen. 1996. “Social Politics in Context: The Institutional Politics Theory and State-Level U.S. Social Spending Policies at the End of the New Deal.” Social Forces 75(1): 33–60.
- Cauthen, Nancy K. and Edwin Amenta. 1996. “Not For Widows Only: Institutional Politics and the Formative Years of Aid to Dependent Children.” American Sociological Review 61(3): 427–48.
- Amenta, Edwin, Kathleen Dunleavy, and Mary Bernstein. 1994. “Stolen Thunder? Huey Long's 'Share Our Wealth,' Political Mediation, and the Second New Deal.” American Sociological Review 59: 678–702.
- Amenta, Edwin. 1993. “The State of the Art in Welfare State Research on Social Spending Efforts in Capitalist Democracies since 1960.” American Journal of Sociology 99(3): 750–63.
- Amenta, Edwin, Bruce G. Carruthers, and Yvonne Zylan. 1992. “A Hero For the Aged? The Townsend Movement, the Political Mediation Model, and U.S. Old-Age Policy, 1934-1950.” American Journal of Sociology 98(2): 308–39.
- Amenta, Edwin and Yvonne Zylan. 1991. “It Happened Here: Political Opportunity, the New Institutionalism, and the Townsend Movement.” American Sociological Review 56(2): 250–65.
- Amenta, Edwin and Sunita Parikh. 1991. "Capitalists Did Not Want the Social Security Act: A Critique of the 'Capitalist Dominance' Thesis." American Sociological Review 56(1): 124–129.
- Amenta, Edwin and Bruce G. Carruthers. 1988. “The Formative Years of U.S. Social Spending: Theories of the Welfare State and the American States During the Great Depression.” American Sociological Review 53(5): 661–78.
- Skocpol, Theda and Edwin Amenta. 1985. “Did Capitalists Shape Social Security?” American Sociological Review 50(4): 572–5.
