= Political movement =

Movement to obtain a political goal

The symbol designed for the British nuclear disarmament movement in 1958 is now widely known as the "peace sign".

A political movement is a collective attempt by a group of people to change government policy or social values. Political movements are usually in opposition to an element of the status quo, and are often associated with a certain ideology. Some theories of political movements are the political opportunity theory, which states that political movements stem from mere circumstances, and the resource mobilization theory which states that political movements result from strategic organization and relevant resources. Political movements are also related to political parties in the sense that they both aim to make an impact on the government and that several political parties have emerged from initial political movements. While political parties are engaged with a multitude of issues, political movements tend to focus on only one major issue.

== Political movement theories ==
Some of the theories behind social movements have also been applied to the emergence of political movements in specific, like the political opportunity theory and the resource mobilization theory.

=== Political opportunity theory ===
The political opportunity theory asserts that political movements occur through chance or certain opportunities and have little to do with resources, connections or grievances in society. Political opportunities can be created by possible changes in the political system, structure or by other developments in the political sphere and they are the driving force for political movements to be established.

=== Resource mobilization theory ===
The resource mobilization theory states that political movements are the result of careful planning, organizing and fundraising rather than spontaneous uprisings or societal grievances. This theory postulates that movements rely on resources and contact to the establishment in order to fully develop. Thus, at the beginning and core of a political movement there lies a strategic mobilization of individuals.

== Relation to political parties ==
Political movements are different from political parties since movements are usually focused on a single issue and they have no interest in attaining office in government. A political movement is generally an informal organization and uses unconventional methods to achieve their goals. In a political party, a political organization seeks to influence or control government policy through conventional methods, usually by nominating their candidates and seating candidates in politics and governmental offices.

However, political parties and movements both aim to influence government in one way or another and both are often related to a certain ideology. Parties also participate in electoral campaigns and educational outreach or protest actions aiming to convince citizens or governments to take action on the issues and concerns which are the focus of the movement.

Some political movements have turned into or launched political parties. For example, the 15-M Movement against austerity in Spain led to the creation of the populist party Podemos and the labor movements in Brazil helped form the Brazilian Workers' Party. These types of movement parties serve to raise awareness on the main issue of their initial political movement in government, since the established parties may have neglected this issue in the past.

Political scientists Santos and Mercea argue that, in recent years, "the rise of movement parties across Europe has disrupted traditional notions of party politics and opened up new avenues for citizen engagement and political mobilisation. Movement parties are the reflection of a wider socio-political transformation of increasing interconnection between electoral and non-electoral politics". They identify four types of movement parties: green/left-libertarian, far-right, eclectic, and centrist.

For groups seeking to influence policy, social movements can provide an alternative to formal electoral politics. For example, the political scientist S. Laurel Weldon has shown that women's movements and women's policy agencies have tended to be more effective in reducing violence against women than the presence of women in the legislatures.

High barriers to entry to the political competition can disenfranchise political movements.

== Examples ==
Some political movements have aimed to change government policy, such as the anti-war movement, the ecology movement, alter-globalization and the anti-globalization movement. With globalization, global citizens movements may have also emerged. Many political movements have aimed to establish or broaden the rights of subordinate groups, such as abolitionism, the women's suffrage movement, the civil rights movement, feminism, gay rights movement, the disability rights movement, the animal rights movement, or the inclusive human rights movement. Some have represented class interests, such as the labour movement, socialism, and communism, while others have expressed national aspirations, including both anticolonialist movements, such as Rātana and Sinn Féin, as well as colonialist movements such as Manifest destiny. Political movements can also involve struggles to decentralize or centralize state control, as in anarchism, fascism, and Nazism.

Famous recent social movements can be classified as political movements as they have influenced policy changes at all levels of government. Political movements that have recently emerged within the US are the Black Lives Matter Movement, and the Me Too Movement. While in some cases these political movements remained movements, in others they escalated into revolutions and changed governments, such as the Middle East's Arab Spring.

Movements may also be named by outsiders, as with the Levellers political movement in 17th century England, which was named so as a term of disparagement. Yet admirers of the movement and its aims later came to use the term, and it is this term by which they are most known to history.

== Mass movements ==
A mass movement denotes a political party or movement which is supported by large segments of a population. Political movements that typically advocate the creation of a mass movement include the ideologies of communism, fascism, and liberalism. Both communists and fascists typically support the creation of mass movements as a means to overthrow a government (Note: Contrast Leninist Vanguardism.) and create their own government, the mass movement then being used afterwards to protect the new political system from being overthrown itself; whereas liberals seek mass participation in the system of representative democracy.

The social scientific study of mass movements focuses on such elements as charisma, leadership, active minorities, cults and sects, followers, mass man and mass society, alienation, brainwashing and indoctrination, authoritarianism and totalitarianism. The field emerged from crowd or mass psychology of Le Bon, Tarde and others, which had gradually widened its scope from mobs to social movements and opinion currents, and then to mass and media society.

One influential early text was the double essay on the herd instinct (1908-1909) by British surgeon Wilfred Trotter. Trotter's work influenced the key concepts of the superego and identification in Sigmund Freud's Massenpsychologie (1921), misleadingly translated as Group Psychology. Trotter and Freud are linked to ideas on sexual repression leading to rigid personalities, in the original Mass Psychology of Fascism (1933) by Freudo-Marxist Wilhelm Reich (not to be confused with its totally revised 1946 American version). This then rejoined ideas formulated by the Frankfurt School and Theodor Adorno, ultimately leading to a major American study of the authoritarian personality by Adorno and others (1950), as a basis for xenophobia and anti-Semitism. Another early theme was the relationship between masses and élites, both outside and within such movements (Gaetano Mosca, Vilfredo Pareto, Robert Michels, Moisey Ostrogorski).

== See also ==
General

Politician, Political spectrum, political science, political history (political thought history), political sociology (political opportunity, resource mobilization), political structure

States

Sovereignty (sovereign state), nation state, federated state, member state, nation, The Estates

People

John Locke, Georg Hegel, Karl Marx, Max Weber, Thomas Hobbes, Michel Foucault, Alexis de Tocqueville

Political philosophy

Autonomy (social identity), collective action, democracy, economic freedom, egalitarianism, equality before the law, equal opportunity, free will, social framing, gender equality, intellectual freedom, liberty, justice (moral responsibility), political freedom (assembly, association, choice, speech), political representation (representative democracy), political legitimacy, racial equality, rights (civil liberties), social cohesion, social equality

Political views

Conservatism, environmentalism, fascism, feminism, liberalism, Marxism, nationalism, socialism, list of political ideologies

Other

Conservatism in the United States, Constitutional Movement, contentious politics, environmental movement, green politics, political aspects of Islam, political activism, political protest, sanctuary movement, Tea Party movement

- Collective behavior
- Cult
- Elite theory
- Iron law of oligarchy
- Leadership
- Minority influence
- Social movement
- Non-state actor

== Bibliography ==
Mass movements

- Hoffer, Eric, The True Believer: Thoughts on the Nature of Mass Movements, New York, NY: Harper Perennial Modern Classics, 2002.
- Marx, Gary, T. & McAdam, Douglas, Collective behavior and social movements, Englewood Cliffs, NJ: Prentice Hall, 1994.
- Van Ginneken, Jaap, Mass movements – In Darwinist, Freudian and Marxist perspective, Apeldoorn (Neth.): Spinhuis. 2007.
- Wilson, John, Introduction to social movements, New York: Basic, 1973.
