= Mayer Zald =

American sociologist (1931–2012)

Mayer Nathan Zald
- Born: June 17, 1931; Detroit, Michigan, U.S.
- Died: August 7, 2012 (aged 81); Ann Arbor, Michigan, U.S.
- Citizenship: American
- Education: University of Hawaiʻi; University of Michigan
- Known for: sociology of organizations and social movements theory
- Awards: John D. McCarthy Award for Lifetime Achievement in the Scholarship of Social Movements and Collective Behavior (2008)
- Scientific career
- Fields: Sociology
- Workplaces: University of Chicago, Vanderbilt University; University of Michigan

Mayer Nathan Zald (June 17, 1931 – August 7, 2012) was an American sociologist. He was a professor of sociology, social work and business administration at the University of Michigan, he made contributions to the sociology of organizations and social movements.

== Biography ==
Mayer Zald was born in Detroit on June 17, 1931. His Ph.D. advisor and mentor was Morris Janowitz. His doctoral dissertation was on Multiple Goals and Staff Relations: A Comparative Study of Correctional Institutions for Juvenile Delinquents. He earned both his BA (1953) and PhD (1961) at University of Michigan, with MA (1955) from the University of Hawaiʻi. He then taught at the University of Chicago (1960–1964) and Vanderbilt University (1964–1977), before returning to the University of Michigan in 1977.

During his career, he was chairman of the sociology department at Vanderbilt University from 1971 to 1975. He was twice chairman of the sociology department at Michigan from 1981 to 1986 and again from 1990 to 1992. He was a professor of sociology, social work, and business administration at the University of Michigan, where he taught from 1977, eventually holding a position of Distinguished Senior Faculty Lecturer in the College of Literature, Science, and the Arts; in 2001 he became a professor emeritus. In the period 1997-2001 he also was a Visiting Distinguished Professor at the University of Arizona. In 2002 he was a visiting professor at the University of California, San Diego. In 2007-2008 he was a Visiting Distinguished Professor of Sociology at University of California, Irvine. In 2010, Mayer returned to Vanderbilt University to deliver the inaugural lecture in the Department of Sociology's Distinguished Social Movement Scholar Lecture Series.

He was on Board of Editors of the American Journal of Sociology from 1960 to 1970, its Associate Editor in the period 1962-63, and Advisory Editor in 1974-78. He was also on Boards of Editors of Social Problems (1964–68) and Journal of Health and Social Behavior (1967–70). In the period of 1979-82 he was the Associate Editor of the American Sociological Review. In 1995 he was on the Editorial Board of the Mobilization: an International Journal.

Zald served as chairs of the Collective Behavior and Social Movements section of the American Sociological Association (ASA) in 1982-83 and also for the Section on Occupations & Organizations in 1985-1986; he served as a vice president for the ASA in 1986-87. He also served on several of ASA's committees. He was nominated (but not elected) for the President of the American Sociological Association twice (in 1990 and in 1992). He was a fellow of the American Academy of Arts and Sciences.

He died in Ann Arbor in 2012, following a heart attack.

== Work and influence ==
On his home page at Michigan Zald wrote that his research focused "on social movement theory, organizational theory, and on sociology as a science and a humanities". Zald made substantial contributions to the field of social movement research. The term social movement organization (SMO) entered the literature through the work of Zald and Roberta Ash (now Garner) (Zald, Mayer N. and Roberta Ash, Social Movement Organizations: Growth, Decay and Change. Social Forces 44:327-341, 1966). As of 2012 their article in Social Forces was one of top 10 most frequently cited articles ever published in this journal. With John D. McCarthy, Zald developed the resource mobilization theory, which became one of the major theories on social movements. Zald’s article with McCarthy, “Resource Mobilization and Social Movements: A Partial Theory,” published in the American Journal of Sociology in May 1977, has been described by Jeff Goodwin as one of the most influential and frequently cited articles in the field and in the discipline. Zald and McCarthy called "attention to the rising trend of professional activism in social movements and [applied] general principles of organizational dynamics to" social movement organizations.

Zald wrote more than 60 articles in all and wrote and edited nearly two dozen books; as of May 2012 his CV listed 21 Books and Monographs, 67 Empirical Studies and Theoretical Essays, 44 "Review Articles and Commentaries" and 5 "Pamphlets and Reports". His works included including Social Movements in an Organizational Society: Collected Essays (with John McCarthy) (1987), Comparative Perspectives on Social Movements (with Doug McAdam and John McCarthy) (1996), and Social Movements and the Transformation of American Health Care (with Jane Banaszak-Holl and Sandra Levitsky) (2010).

In 2008 he received the John D. McCarthy Award for Lifetime Achievement in the Scholarship of Social Movements and Collective Behavior from the Center for the Study of Social Movements and Social Change at University of Notre Dame.
