= Value-added theory =

Sociological theory

Value-added theory (also known as social strain theory) is a sociological theory, first proposed by Neil Smelser in 1962, which posits that certain conditions are needed for the development of a social movement.

== Overview ==
Smelser porter considered social movements to be the side-effects of rapid social change. He argued that six things were necessary and sufficient for collective behavior to emerge, and that social movements must evolve through the following relevant stages:

- Structural conduciveness: the structure of society must be organized in such a way that certain protest actions become more likely.
- Structural strain: there must be a strain on society that is caused by factors related to the structure of the current social system, such as inequality or injustice, and existing power holders are unwilling or unable to address the problem.
- Generalized belief: the strain should be clearly defined, agreed upon, and understood by participants in group action.
- Precipitating factors: event(s) must occur that act as the proverbial spark that ignites the flame of action.
- Mobilization for action: participants must have a network and organization that allows them to take collective action.
- Operation (failure) of social control: authorities either will or will not react. High levels of social control by those in power, like politicians or police, often makes it more difficult for social movements to achieve their goals.

== In academia ==
The concept of value added is also utilized in the field of economics; in this case it refers to the total value of the revenue created by a product minus intermediate consumption.

== Criticism ==
Critics of value-added theory note that it is overly focused on the structural-functional approach because it views all strain on society as disruptive.

== See also ==
- Value theory
- Relative deprivation
- Framing
- Political opportunity
- Resource mobilization
