= Legal opportunity structure =

Legal opportunity structure or legal opportunity is a concept found in the study of law and social movements. It was first used in order to distinguish it from political opportunity structure or political opportunity, on the basis that law and the courts deserved to be studied in their own right rather than being lumped together with political institutions. Legal opportunities are made up of: access to the courts, which may be affected in particular by the law on standing or locus standi, and costs rules; 'legal stock' or the set of available precedents on which to hang a case; and judicial receptiveness. Some of these are more obviously structural than others - hence the term legal opportunity is sometimes preferred over legal opportunity structure.

Legal opportunity has been used as an independent variable to help to explain strategy choice by social movement organisations (SMOs) - e.g. why SMOS adopt litigation rather than protest or political lobbying as a strategy. Other variables or explanatory frameworks it is commonly found alongside include framing, resource mobilization and grievance. It can also be employed as a dependent variable. Legal opportunity theory has been applied to a wide range of policy areas which have seen legal mobilization by social movements, including the environmental, animal rights, women's, LGBT, labor, civil rights, human rights, and disability movements.
