= Álvaro Múnera =

Spanish bullfighter (born 1965)

Álvaro Múnera Builes (born November 19, 1965), also known as El Pilarico is a Columbian former bullfighter. He is best known for his pivot towards animal rights activism following his retirement.

Despite common notions that Múnera retired from bullfighting as a result of a change of heart during a fight, he in fact retired as a result of being paralysed in a fight at the age of 22.
