= Social movement impact theory =

Social movement impact theory (otherwise known as outcome theory) is a subcategory of social movement theory, and focuses on assessing the impacts that social movements have on society, as well as what factors might have led to those effects.

== Background ==
Social movement impact theory has been studied far less than most other subcategories of social movement theory, mostly due to methodological issues. It is relatively new, and was only introduced in 1975 with William Gamson's book "The Strategy of Social Protest", followed by Piven and Cloward's book Poor People's Movements. In his groundbreaking study, Gamson studied 53 social movement organizations from between 1800 and 1945, and collected data regarding their success.

Among Gamson's most important findings were that organizations which attempt to displace a specific person in power are almost never successful; that movement violence is a symptom of success (not a cause of it); that bureaucratic organizations are more likely to be successful, but also more likely to be co-opted by elites; and that organizations that are allowed to emerge in times of political calm are more successful during times of turbulence. These findings catalyzed some of the major debates in impact theory.

Two years later, Piven and Cloward published Poor People's Movements, which argued that power structures are threatened by disorganized and disruptive people. This provoked a major backlash among Social Movement Theorists, and the idea that organization in social movements is harmful has been largely discredited. They also argue that social movement organizations will be most successful when there is a divide among the elites, and some elites are forced to side with the poor. This was received more favorably, and was a catalytic idea in the political mediation model.

The publishing of these two books sparked debate between scholars, many of whom began to focus on impacts more specifically.

== Methodology ==
Finding appropriate methods to use for studying the impacts of social movements is problematic in many ways, and is generally a large deterrent to scholars to study in the field. The first problem scholars ran into was defining "success" for social movements. Scholars and activists often have disagreements of what a movement's goals are, and thus come to different conclusions about whether a movement has "succeeded." Many times there are positive impacts, but they are not what were anticipated by anyone. For this reason scholars have tended to use the Collective Goods Criterion (see below) after Gamson originally published his work and garnered criticism.

Other issues arise when one attempts to locate a movement's impact in all arenas. Impacts are most often studied at the political level, and yet it has been proven that they have individual, cultural, institutional, and international effects as well. Lastly, and most importantly, there is the issue of causality. It is very difficult to prove that a social movement caused a certain outcome, rather than other social phenomena, and scholars have used that argument to discredit studies of movement impacts.

In the study that popularized impact theory, William Gamson studied 53 social movement organizations that were active between 1800 and 1945, and coded each one for attributes of success and certain other organizational characteristics. Gamson's criterion for success included "New Advantages," or the attainment of organizational goals, and "Acceptance," or being included in national discourse and political circles.

The Collective Goods Criterion is a methodology critical of Gamson's specific definition of success. Rather than limiting movement success to attainment of goals, it looks at any advancement in the general category of goods that the agitators demand as success. This has proven to be a more inclusive method, because many movements will increase the well-being of their constituents, only indirectly or in a different form.

In "How Social Movements Matter", Giugni recommends that in order to combat problems of causality, scholars should conduct studies with large sample sizes, that address a diversity of time periods and places, that examine with equal rigor movement successes and failures, and which control for other societal factors which affect the change being studied.

== Major debates ==
=== Channels of protest ===
This extremely controversial debate is centered around the efficacy of more radical and disruptive tactics (including targeted violence, riots, or general disorder) as opposed to more mainstream tactics (such as marches, rallies, and political lobbying).

This issue is extremely complex because it seems to be extremely context-dependent. Gamson's original study found that disruption did usually lead to movement success; however, it was with certain qualifications. First, the results have to face the striking counterexample of labor unions, which were greatly weakened by violent strikes most of the time. Furthermore, Gamson found that movements that had already achieved some viability were more likely to use violence. Thus, Gamson concluded that violence in movements is more of a result of strength than a cause of it. This is confirmed by other historical events, which show that violence generally give an advantage to the side that is already ahead, whether it is used by the movement, or by the state. Nevertheless, the subject remains controversial, and continues to be denied by pluralists.

=== Organizational vs. external influence ===
Scholars have also debated whether social movement organizations ultimately play a significant role in their victories, or whether success is more determined by outside factors. In Gamson's original study, he found that organizational factors play a crucial role. This has been confirmed by other studies; however, certain qualifications have been made. External support has been shown to have some influence, particularly when elite allies are combined with strong organization. This contradiction has inspired scholars to create political mediation theory. Ultimately, it is hard to avoid a context-dependent answer to this controversy, and scholars are now encouraging an approach which synthesizes organizational influence with others.

== Types of impact ==
Social movements affect society in many ways. Below are the four most important.

=== Individual change ===
The psychology of the individuals who participate in movements are profoundly affected. Activists connect with others affiliated with their cause, causing new networks to form and shared values to be accentuated. They also undergo a process of empowerment, in which they become more apt for further activism.

=== Institutional change ===
Non-state institutions can also be targeted and changed by social movements, as is the case for any boycott or divestment campaign. Other movements can take place within the workplace itself, as with labor organizing or cooperative movements. Scholars have begun analysis of institution-specific campaigns, and have theorized that there are four institutional characteristics which make it vulnerable to change: 1) Rapid growth in terms of money or members, 2) diffuseness or decentralization of organization, 3) strength of links between clients and professionals, and 4) ties to the state.

=== Cultural ===
Culture often becomes a target of social movements when their demands have to do with personal action. Such was the case with the feminist movement, in which organizations put a large amount of resources to books, magazines, art, and other channels of culture; this has been shown to contribute to the shift in family dynamics and institutional structures.

=== Political ===
Political change is the most studied aspect of social movement impacts, and possibly the most hotly contested. Some have argued that because democratic governments are completely permeable to the public, social movements can only create inequality in representation; however, this view has been discredited.

== See also ==
- Political opportunity
