= Moral shock =

Concept in sociology

In sociology, moral shock is a cognitive and emotional process that encourages participation. James M. Jasper, who originally coined the term, used it to help explain why people might join a social movement in the absence of pre-existing social ties with members. It denotes a kind of visceral unease, triggered by personal or public events, that captures people’s attention. Moral shocks often force people to articulate their moral intuitions. It is an appealing concept because it brings together emotional, moral, and cognitive dynamics. According to David A. Snow and Sarah A. Soule, authors of “A Primer on Social Movements”, the moral shock argument says that some events may be so emotionally moving or morally reprehensible that individuals will feel that they must join the cause regardless of their connection or ties to members of that organization. Moral shock is similar in many ways to shock advertising which uses analogous techniques to help increase brand success and awareness. Moral shocks have been shown to help recruit people to the animal rights movement, the movement for peace in Central America, anti-abortion campaigns and anti-racist movements.

Deborah Gould has suggested another role for moral shocks: radicalizing or reinforcing the commitment of those already active in a protest movement. She says that the 1986 Bowers v. Hardwick decision by the U.S. Supreme Court had this effect on the U.S. gay and lesbian rights movements. Hardwick told the lesbian and gay community that their own government supported their oppression. Indignation at one’s own government can be especially moving, as it involves a sense of betrayal. Furthermore, violent repression of peaceful protest is thus a frequent source of moral shock.

The impact of moral shock is illustrated in the film Unborn in the USA in which the ProLife on Campus organization is highlighted in its travels to college campuses across the country. Using a set of extremely large and graphic images of abortion and abortion procedures the group attempts to portray their anti-abortion messages on college campuses—targeting young people who they believe are particularly prone to getting involved. They believe the images are very effective ways to shine light on the truth of what abortion does to innocent children. Unless the public is made aware of this perceived injustice, it will never be able to end, according to statements on their website. The group’s slogan is “Winning Hearts…Changing Minds…and Saving Lives…”

Brian Lowe suggests that moral shocks are especially likely when someone holds a sweeping movement ideology that takes the form of a “quasi-religion.”

== Jasper on Moral Shocks ==
In Chapter 5 of The Art of Moral Protest, Jasper defines a moral shock as "an unexpected event or piece of information [which] raises such a sense of outrage in a person that she becomes inclined toward political action, with or without the network of personal contacts emphasized in mobilization and process theories." For example, seeing a documentary about illicit banking practices may motivate an individual to participate in financial reform efforts. The motivation generated by a moral shock is, as the conceptual label makes plain, moral in nature; it operates at a level of normative force beyond just the purely cognitive or emotional. However, "for a moral shock to lead to protest, it must have an explicit cognitive dimension as well as moral and emotional ones." Moral shocks are moral insofar as they create a sense of outrage or indignation, emotional insofar as anger or frustration accompanies this outrage, and cognitive insofar as the shock is delivered via words and symbols. For instance, the aforementioned documentary uses such cognitive devices to get its message across, but it also relies on emotional appeal and the resulting, normatively stronger, sense of moral outrage.

Moral shock as a concept is especially important because it pinpoints a factor that motivates individuals to protest that is not reducible to factors highlighted by resource mobilization and political opportunity theories (e.g., social networks, preexisting beliefs). The Art of Moral Protest shows that would-be protestors do not always know other protestors and often formulate their beliefs on the fly, so to speak. Hence, Jasper’s concept is able to account for an additional path into protest, a path emphasizing the relative importance of events and their initial consciousness-raising effects on individuals.
