= John D. McCarthy =

John David McCarthy (born 1940) is an American sociologist. He earned his Ph.D. degree in Sociology at University of Oregon in 1968. He is currently a professor of Sociology at Pennsylvania State University.

He has contributed to the research of social movement and resource mobilization theory. His research and teaching interests include Collective Behavior and Social Movements; Policing of the Public Order; Formal Organizations; and Mass Media Processes.

== Research projects ==
In recent years he has been a Principal Investigator of projects on Local Poor Empowerment Community Organizations (with Ed Walker); Media Coverage of Washington, D. C. Protest Gatherings; the Evolution of Public Protest in the U.S., 1960-1995 (with Sarah Soule, Susan Olzak and Doug McAdam); the Evolution of Social Movement Organizations in the U.S., 1959-2002 (with Frank Baumgartner); and Public Order Disturbances on College a University Campuses during the past decade (with Pat Rafail, Ed Walker, Andrew Martin and Clark McPhail). He is co-directing (with Chris Scheitle) a National Science Foundation funded project on “Spiritual Entrepreneurialism.”

== John D. McCarthy Award ==
The Center for the Study of Social Movements (CSSM) at the University of Notre Dame established the John D. McCarthy Award for Lifetime Achievement in the Scholarship of Social Movement and Collective Behavior in 2007 to recognize scholars who have made “outstanding contributions to the scholarly literature concerned with social movements, protest, collective violence, riots, and other kinds of collective behavior”. The 2013 award winner was David Snow (at UC-Irvine). Past recipients of the award include Pam Oliver at Wisconsin-Madison (2012), Bill Gamson at Boston College (2011), Doug McAdam at Stanford University (2010), Mayer Zald at Michigan (2009), Verta Taylor at UC-Santa Barbara (2008), and John McCarthy (2007).

== Selected publications ==
- Walker, Edward T., John D. McCarthy and Frank Baumgartner. “Replacing Members with Managers? Mutualism Among Membership and Non-Membership Advocacy Organizations in the U.S.” Forthcoming. American Journal of Sociology.
- Johnson, Erik W., Jon Agnone and John D. McCarthy. 2010 “Movement Organizations, Synergistic Tactics and Environmental Public Policy.”Social Forces. 88:2267-2292.
- Walker, Edward T. and John D. McCarthy. 2010 “Legitimacy, Strategy and Resources in the Survival of Community-Based Organizations.” Social Problems 57:315-340.
- Schwadel, Phillip A., John D. McCarthy and Hart M. Nelsen. 2009 “The Continuing Relevance of Family Income for Religious Participation: U.S. White Catholic Church Attendance in the Late 20th Century.” Social Forces. 87(4):1997-2030.
- Martin, Andrew, John D. McCarthy and Clark McPhail. 2009. “Why Targets Matter: Toward a More Inclusive Model of Collective Violence”American Sociological Review. 74(5):821-841.
- McCarthy, John D., Larissa Titarenko, Clark McPhail, Boguslaw Augustyn and Pat Rafail. 2008. “Selection Bias in the Newspaper Coverage of Protests in Minsk, Belarus, 1990-1995.” Mobilization. 13(2): 127–146.
- Walker, Edward T., Andrew Martin and John D. McCarthy. 2008. “Confronting the State, the Corporation and the Academy: The Influence of Institutional Targets on Social Movement Repertoires.” American Journal of Sociology. 114:35-76.
- McCarthy, John D., Andrew Martin and Clark McPhail. 2007. “Policing Disorderly Campus Protests and Convivial Gatherings: The Interaction of Threat, Social Organization and First Amendment Guarantees.” Social Problems 54(3):274-296.
- Martin, Andrew, Frank Baumgartner and John D. McCarthy. 2006. “Measuring Association Populations Using the Encyclopedia of Associations: Evidence from the Field of Labor Unions, Social Science Research. 35:771-778.
- McCarthy, John D. and Clark McPhail. 2006. “Places of protest: The public forum in principle and practice.” Mobilization 11:229-247.
- Minkoff, Debra and John D. McCarthy. 2005. “Reinvigorating the Study of Organizational Processes in Social Movements.” Mobilization.10:289-308.
- Edwards, Bob and John D. McCarthy, 2004. “Strategy Matters: The Contingent Value of Social Capital in the Survival of Local Social Movement Organizations.” Social Forces83(2): 621–652.
- Earl, Jennifer, Andrew Martin, Sarah Soule and John D. McCarthy. 2004. “The Use of Newspaper Data in the Study of Collective Action.” Annual Review of Sociology. 30:65-80.
- McPhail, Clark and John D. McCarthy. 2004. “Who Counts and How: Estimating the Size of Protests.” Contexts. 3(3): 12–18.
- McCarthy, John D. and Edward T. Walker. 2004. “Alternative Organizational Repertoires of Poor People’s Social Movement Organizations.”Nonprofit and Voluntary Sector Quarterly 33 (Supplement): S97-S119.
- Edwards, Bob and John D. McCarthy. 2004. “Resources and Social Movement Mobilization,” pp. 116–152 in The Blackwell Companion to Social Movements, edited by David A. Snow, Sarah A. Soule, and Hanspeter Kriesi. Oxford, UK: Blackwell Publishers.
- Earl, Jennifer, Sarah Soule and John D. McCarthy. 2003“Protest Under Fire? Explaining the Policing of Protest.” American Sociological Review 68:581-606.
- McCarthy, John D. and Mayer N. Zald. 2002. “The Enduring Vitality of the Resource Mobilization Theory of Social Movements.” pp. 533–565 in Jonathan H. Turner, ed. Handbook of Sociological Theory. New York: Kluwer Academic/Plenum Publishers.
- Titarenko, Larissa, John D. McCarthy, Clark McPhail and Boguslaw Augustyn. 2001. “The Interaction of State Repression, Protest Form and Protest Sponsor Strength during the Transition from Communism in Minsk, Belarus, 1990-1995.” Mobilization 6:129-150.
- Smith, Jackie, John D. McCarthy, Clark McPhail and Boguslaw Augustyn. 2001. “From Protest to Agenda Building: Description Bias in Media Coverage of Protest Events in Washington, D.C.” Social Forces 79:1397-1423.
- McCarthy, John D. Clark McPhail and John Crist. 1999. “The Emergence and Diffusion of Public Order Management Systems: Protest Cycles and Police Response.” pp. 49–69 in Globalization and Social Movements. Ed. By Hanspeter Kriesi, Donatella della Porta and Dieter Rucht. London: McMillan.
- McCarthy, John D. and Clark McPhail. 1998. “The Institutionalization of Protest in the United States.” pp. 83–110 in The Social Movement Society: Contentious Politics for a New Century. Ed. by David S. Meyers and Sidney Tarrow. Lanham, MD: Rowman and Littlefield.
- McAdam, Doug, John D. McCarthy and Mayer N. Zald (Eds.). 1996. Comparative Perspectives on Social Movements: Political Opportunity, Mobilizing Structures and Cultural Framings. New York: Cambridge University Press.
- McCarthy, John D.Clark McPhail and Jackie Smith. 1996. “Images of Protest: Estimating Selection Bias in Media Coverage of Washington Demonstrations, 1982, 1991.” American Sociological Review 61:478-499.
- McCarthy, John D. and Mark Wolfson. 1996. “Resource Mobilization by Local Social Movement Organizations: The Role of Agency, Strategy and Structure.” American Sociological Review 61:1070-1088.
- McCarthy, John D., David W. Britt and Mark Wolfson. 1991. “The Channeling of Social Movements in the Modern American State.” Social Movements, Conflict, and Change. 13:45-76.
- Zald, Mayer N. and John D. McCarthy. 1987. Social Movements in an Organizational Society. New Brunswick, NJ: Transaction Books.
- McCarthy, John D. and Dean R. Hoge. 1987. “The Social Construction of School Punishment: Racial Disadvantage Out of Universalistic Process.” Social Forces 65: 1101–1120.
- McCarthy, John D. and Dean R. Hoge. 1985. “The Dynamics of Self-Esteem and Delinquency.” American Journal of Sociology 90:396-410.
- McCarthy, John D. and Dean R. Hoge. 1982. “Analysis of Age Effects in Longitudinal Studies of Adolescent Self-Esteem.” Developmental Psychology 18:372-379.
- Zald, Mayer N. and John D. McCarthy. 1979. The Dynamics of Social Movements, Winthrop Pub. Co., Cambridge, MA.
- McCarthy, John D. and Mayer N. Zald. 1977. “Resource Mobilization and Social Movements: A Partial Theory.” American Journal of Sociology82: 1212–1241.
- McCarthy, John D. and Mayer N. Zald. 1973. The Trend of Social Movements in America: Professionalization and Resource Mobilization, General Learning Press, Morristown, NJ.
- McCarthy, John D. and William L. Yancey. 1971. “Uncle Tom and Mister Charlie: Metaphysical Pathos in the Study of Racism and Personal Disorganization.” American Journal of Sociology 76: 648–672.
