= New social movements =

Theory of organized efforts for human rights in post-industrial countries

The term new social movements (NSMs) is a theory of social movements that attempts to explain the plethora of new movements that have come up in various western societies roughly since the mid-1960s (i.e. in a post-industrial economy) which are claimed to depart significantly from the conventional social movement paradigm.

There are two central claims of the NSM theory. First, that the rise of the post-industrial economy is responsible for a new wave of social movement and second, that those movements are significantly different from previous social movements of the industrial economy. The primary difference is in their goals, as the new movements focus not on issues of materialistic qualities such as economic wellbeing, but on issues related to human rights (such as gay rights or pacifism).

Thinkers have related these movements with the postmaterialism hypothesis and New Class Model as put forth by Ronald Inglehart in the silent revolution (1977).

== The new movements ==
Numerous social movements from mid-1960s differed from their precursors, such as the labor movement, which had previously been seen as focused on economic concerns. The 1960s were a period of transformation in collective action, the French May (1968) probably being its most determinant moment. It is important to highlight, however, that it is currently being discussed whether this phenomenon was the first example of a new social movement or as Staricco has stated: "It did not so much open an era as close one. It was not the beginning of a paradigm, but the end of another one. What comes after – the growing importance of new social movements both empirically and theoretically – can be understood as a consequence, but not as a continuation or progression".

The new movements instead of pushing for specific changes in public policy emphasize social changes in identity, lifestyle and culture. Thus the social aspect is seen by the NSM as more important than the economic or political aspects. Some NSM theorists, like F. Parkin (Middle Class Radicalism, 1968), argue that the key actors in these movements are different as well, as they are more likely to come from the "new middle class" rather than the lower classes. Unlike pressure groups that have a formal organisation and 'members', NSMs consist of an informal, loosely organised social network of 'supporters' rather than members. British sociologist Paul Byrne (Note: For his characterization as a British sociologist of social movements, see Rootes (1989). Prior works: Byrne, P. (1998). Nuclear weapon and CND. Parliamentary Affairs, 51(3), 424ff. ISSN 0031-2290; Byrne, P. (1996). The politics of the women's movement. Parliamentary Affairs, 49(1), 55ff. ISSN 0031-2290; Byrne, Paul (1988). The campaign for nuclear disarmament. London New York: Croom Helm. ISBN 978-0-7099-3260-4.) (1997) described New Social Movements as 'relatively disorganised'.

Protest groups tend to be single issue based and are often local in terms of the scope of change they wish to effect. In contrast, NSMs last longer than single issue campaigns and wish to see change on an (inter)national level on various issues in relation to their set of beliefs and ideals. A NSM may, however adopt the tactic of a protest campaign as part of its strategy for achieving wider-ranging change.

Examples of those new movements include the women's movement, the ecology movement, gay rights movement and various peace movements, among others.

== The theory ==
Buechler argues that there is in fact no single new social movement theory, but a set of new social movement theories, each a variant on a general approach to "something called the new social movement", which he cautiously defines as a "diverse array of collective actions that has presumably displaced the old social movement of proletarian revolution".

According to Kendall, the new social movement theory focuses on movement culture; it also pays attention to their identity and on their relations to culture, ideology, and politics.

Important contributors in the field include sociologists such as Alain Touraine, Ernesto Laclau, Chantal Mouffe, Claus Offe, Immanuel Wallerstein, Manuel Castells or philosophers such as Michel Foucault, Jürgen Habermas and Félix Guattari.

== Characteristics ==
The most noticeable feature of new social movements is that they are primarily social and cultural and only secondarily political, if at all. Departing from the worker's movement, which was central to the political aim of gaining access for the working class with the extension of citizenship and representation, new social movements such as youth culture movement concentrate on bringing about social mobilization through cultural innovations, development of new life-styles and transformation of identities. It is clearly elaborated by Habermas that new social movements are the ‘new politics’ which is about quality of life, individual self-realisation and human rights whereas the ‘old politics’ focus on economic, political, and military security. This can be exemplified in the gay liberation, the focus of which broadens out from political issue to social and cultural realization and acceptance of homosexuality. Hence, new social movements are understood as new because they are first and foremost social.

New social movements also give rise to a great emphasis on the role of post-material values in contemporary and post-industrial society as opposed to conflicts over material resources. According to Melucci, one of the leading new social movement theorists, these movements arise not from relations of production and distribution of resources but within the sphere of reproduction and the life world, as a result of which, the concern has shifted from the sole production of economic resources directly connected to the needs for survival or for reproduction to cultural production of social relations, symbols and identities. In other words, the contemporary social movements are rejections of the materialistic orientation of consumerism in capitalist societies by questioning the modern idea that links the pursuit of happiness and success closely to growth, progress, and increased productivity and by promoting alternative values and understandings in relation to the social world. As an example, the environmental movement that has appeared since the late 1960s throughout the world, with its strong points in the United States and Northern Europe, has significantly brought about a ‘dramatic reversal’ in the ways we consider the relationship between economy, society and nature.

Further, new social movements are located in civil society or the cultural sphere as a major arena for collective action rather than instrumental action in the state, which Claus Offe characterises as ‘bypass the state’. Moreover, with its little concern to directly challenge the state, new movements are regarded as anti-authoritarian and resisted incorporation in institutional levels. They tend to focus on single issue, or a limited range of issues connected to a single broad theme such as peace and environment. Without the attempt to develop a total politics under a single focus, new social movements set their stress on grass-roots in the aim of representing the interests of marginal or excluded groups. Paralleled with this ideology, the organization form of new collective actions is also locally based, centred on small social groups and loosely held by personal or informational networks such as radios, newspapers, and posters. This ‘local- and issue-centred’ characteristic which does not necessarily require a highly agreed ideology or agreement on ultimate ends makes these new movements distinctive from the ‘old’ labour movement with a high degree of tolerance of political and ideological difference appealing to broader sections of population.

Additionally, if old social movements namely the worker's movement presupposed a working–class base and ideology, the new social movements are presumed to draw from a different social class base, that is, ‘the new class’, as a complex contemporary class structure that Claus Offe identifies as ‘threefold’: the new middle class, elements of the old middle class and peripheral groups outside the labour market. As stated by Offe, the new middle class in association with the old one is evolved in the new social movements because of their high levels of education and their access to information and resources that lead to the questions of the way society is valued; the group of people that are marginal in terms of labour market such as students, housewives and the unemployed participate in the collective actions as a consequence of their disposable resource of time, their position in the receiving end of bureaucratic control and disability to be fully engaged in the society based on employment and consumption. The main character in old social movements, the industrial working class, nonetheless, is absent here in the class base of new social mobilizations.

== Criticism ==
Some sociologists, like Paul Bagguley and Nelson Pichardo, criticize NSM theory for a number of reasons, including:

1. the movements concerned with non-materialistic issues existed (in one extent or another) during the industrial period and traditional movements, concerned with economic well-being, still exist today,
2. there are few unique characteristics of the new social movements, when compared to the traditional movements,
3. differences between older and newer movements have been explained by older theories,
4. there is doubt in terms of whether contemporary movements are specifically a product of postindustrial society,
5. NSM focuses almost exclusively on left-wing movements and does not consider right-wing,
6. the term "new middle class" is amorphous and not consistently defined, and
7. might be better viewed as a certain instance of social movement theory rather than a brand new one.
8. NSM is largely an extension of 1960s counterculture and built more around protest than any common (internal) unity,
9. newer movements are exceptionalist, where members or proponents see older movements as ineffective or insignificant
10. recent NSMs are fueled by social media and meme culture, often diminishing their seriousness and meaning

== List of new social movements ==
- Abahlali baseMjondolo (South Africa)
- Animal rights movement
- Anti-nuclear movement
- Anti-War movement
- Black Lives Matter (BLM)
- Disability rights movement
- Effective altruism (An international network which attempts to use evidence and reason to identify the most effective ways to improve the world.)
- Extinction Rebellion
- Free software movement
- #MeToo
- Occupy Movement (A global anti-capitalist movement)
- Rastafari
- Shahbag Movement (A mass movement demanding trial of crimes against humanity) (Bangladesh)
- Western Cape Anti-Eviction Campaign (South Africa)
- The Zeitgeist Movement (A global sustainability advocacy movement which spreads awareness about the perceived roots of social problems.)

== See also ==
- Identity politics
- New Left
- New Right
- Social criticism
- Anti-globalization movement
