= Animal rights movement =

Social movement for animal consideration

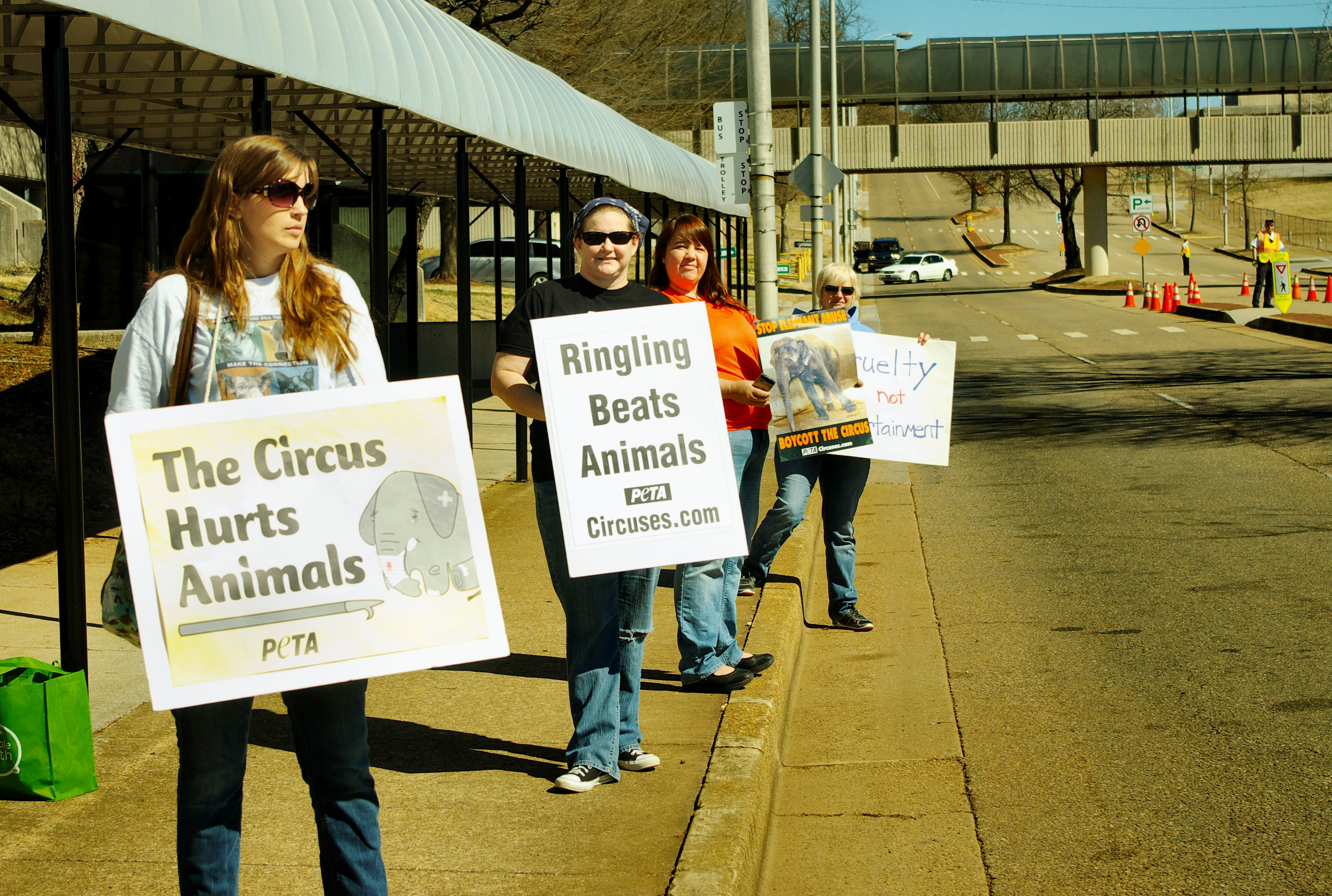
Activists protesting outside the Ringling Brothers Barnum and Bailey Circus at the Civic Coliseum in Knoxville, Tennessee

The animal rights movement, sometimes called the animal liberation, animal personhood, or animal advocacy movement, is a social movement that advocates an end to the rigid moral and legal distinction drawn between human and non-human animals, an end to the status of animals as property, and an end to their use in the research, food, clothing, and entertainment industries.

The argument from marginal cases is often used in animal rights advocacy. It asserts that if humans with severe cognitive limitations are granted moral consideration, then non-human animals, who may possess different forms of intelligence or sentience, should also be afforded similar negative rights and moral consideration.

== Terms and factions ==
All animal liberationists believe that the individual interests of non-human animals deserve recognition and protection, but the movement can be split into two broad camps. Animal rights advocates like Tom Regan believe that these basic interests confer moral rights of some kind on the animals, and/or ought to confer legal rights on them. On the other hand, utilitarian liberationists like Peter Singer do not believe that animals possess moral rights, but argue, on utilitarian grounds — utilitarianism in its simplest form advocating that moral decisions maximize the welfare of sentient beings — that because animals have the ability to suffer, their suffering must be taken into account. To exclude animals from that consideration, they argue, is a form of discrimination that they call speciesism.

Despite these differences, the terms "animal liberation" and "animal rights" are generally used interchangeably. Factional division has also been characterized as that between the reformist or mainstream faction and the radical abolitionist and direct action factions. The mainstream faction is largely professionalized and focuses on soliciting donations and gaining media representation. Actors in the reformist movement believe that humans should stop abusing animals. They employ activities that include moral shocks. It has been noted that the power of the animal rights movement in the United States is centralized in professionalized nonprofit organizations that aim to improve animal welfare.

The abolitionist faction believes that humans should stop using animals altogether. Gary Francione, a leader in abolitionism, formed his approach in response to the traditional movement's focus on policy reform. Some members of the abolitionist faction view policy reform as counterproductive and rely only on nonviolent education and moral persuasion in their activities. They see the promotion of veganism as a means of creating an antispeciesist culture and abolishing animal agriculture. Other abolitionists believe that animal advocates shouldn't rely only on the promotion of veganism and should use a social movement strategy focused on expressing political claims, like what do all the NGOs participating in the World Day for the End of Speciesism during which they express the claim that speciesist practices have to be banned. This political strategy based on the sociology of the social construction of problems is defended by the activist Anoushavan Sarukhanyan who wrote several articles on the issue. In addition to this theoretical disagreement regarding the strategy to be used by abolitionists, there is also a disagreement regarding the question of direct action. Some argue that direct action was used by all social movements so the animal rights movement should do the same, while others point out that these actions are perceived as violent by the public (because of the media framing) and therefore citizens feel less emotional connection with animal activists and in consequence less support the cause. The action repertory of the abolitionists who use direct action includes property damage, animal releases, intimidation, and sometimes even direct violence, aiming to change society through force. Despite this, the unorganized group of abolitionists who use direct action the most, the Animal Liberation Front (ALF), insists that all the direct actions they do to save animals shouldn't harm any human or animal. Nevertheless, many animal rights actors reject this faction, pointing to the fact that even if the actions of the ALF weren't violent they are still perceived as violent by the public and therefore represent a counterproductive tactic that invites repression (e.g., the Animal Enterprise Terrorism Act) while not necessarily economically or politically challenging the existent systems. There are also abolitionist groups focused around faith-based animal rights theory whose approach is characterized by more spirituality and the idea that we shouldn't harm other creatures unnecessarily. The animal rights movement includes also veganarchists, whose approach is characterized by a critique of capitalism on the grounds that it has led to mass nonhuman, human, and environmental exploitation. Such diversity, researchers have pointed out, is common to social movements and plays a role in sustaining their health.

== History ==
The modern animal rights movement traces back to the animal protection movement in Victorian England, which was initiated by crusaders in response to the poor treatment of urban workhorses, the conditions under which they were exported for slaughter and their use, along with stray cats and dogs, for vivisection. Public awareness was raised by, for example, Anna Sewell's 1877 novel Black Beauty and by the pioneer Ada Cole who fought for humane conditions for horses destined for slaughter. Other early influences include: Upton Sinclair's 1906 novel The Jungle, which drew attention to slaughterhouse operations; Henry Stephens Salt's treatises on nonhuman animal rights, which drew from human abolitionist arguments for recognizing the personhood of people considered to be property; and the short-lived Fruitlands agrarian commune, which required its residents to eat a vegan diet.

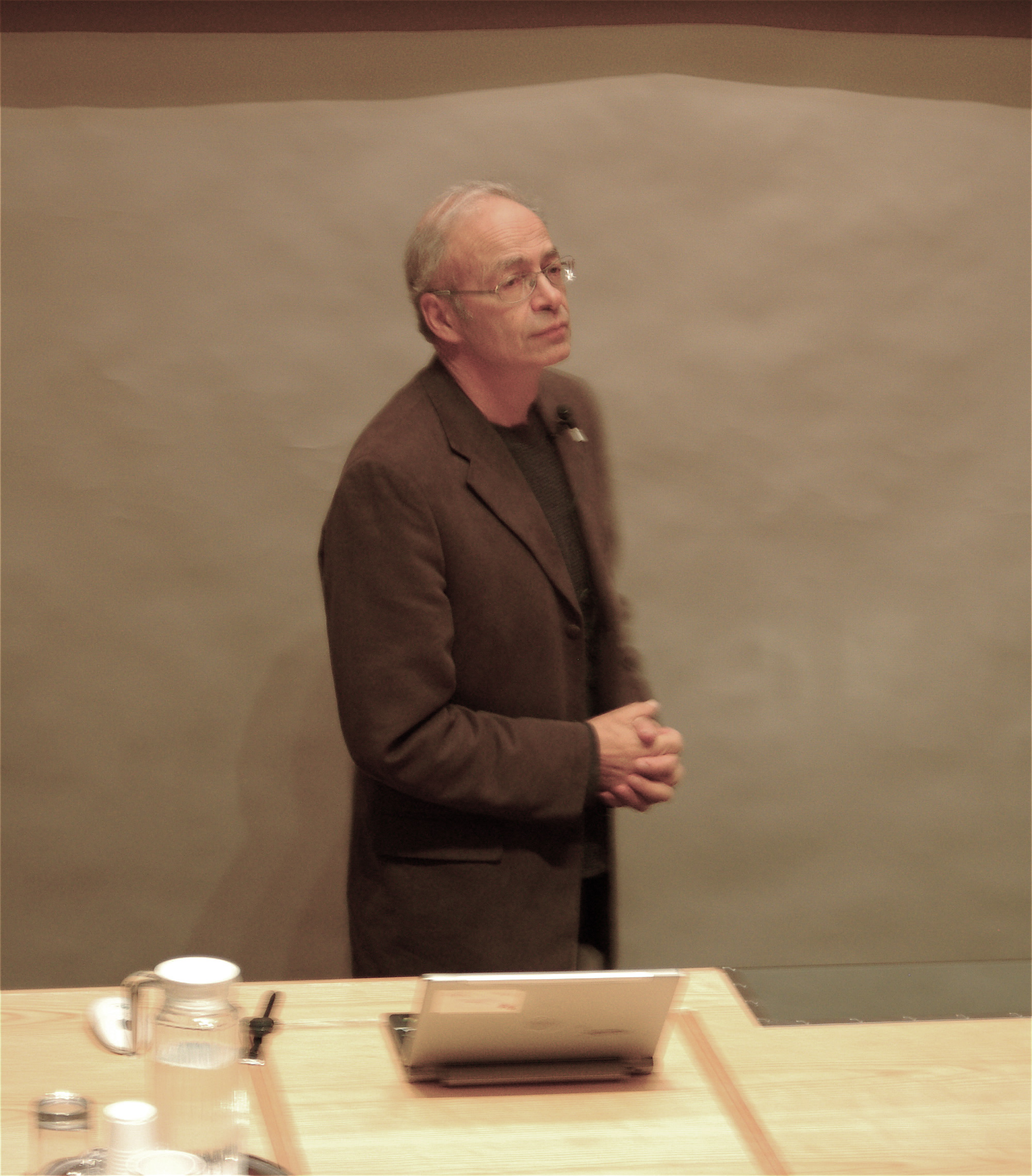
Philosopher Peter Singer

The contemporary movement is regarded as having been founded in the UK in the early 1970s by a group of Oxford university post-graduate philosophy students, now known as the "Oxford Group". The group was led by Rosalind and Stanley Godlovitch, graduate students of philosophy who had recently become vegetarians. The Godlovitches met John Harris and David Wood, also philosophy graduates, who were soon persuaded of the arguments in favour of animal rights and themselves became vegetarian. The group began to actively raise the issue with pre-eminent Oxford moral philosophers, including Professor Richard Hare, both personally and in lectures. Their approach was based not on sentimentality ("kindness to dumb animals"), but on the moral rights of animals. They soon developed (and borrowed) a range of powerful arguments in support of their views, so that Oxford clinical psychologist Richard Ryder, who was shortly to become part of the group, writes that "rarely has a cause been so rationally argued and so intellectually well armed."

It was a 1965 article by novelist Brigid Brophy in The Sunday Times which was pivotal in helping to spark the movement. Brophy wrote:

The relationship of Homo sapiens to the other animals is one of unremitting exploitation. We employ their work; we eat and wear them. We exploit them to serve our superstitions: whereas we used to sacrifice them to our gods and tear out their entrails in order to foresee the future, we now sacrifice them to science, and experiment on their entrail in the hope—or on the mere offchance—that we might thereby see a little more clearly into the present.

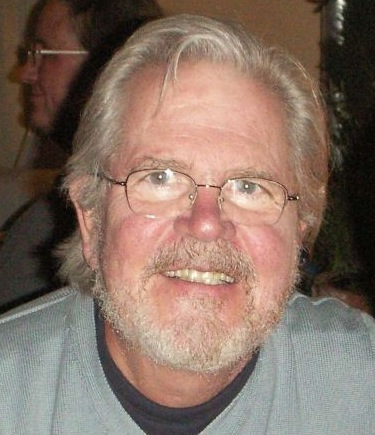
Philosopher Tom Regan

The philosophers found this article and were inspired by its vigorous unsentimental polemic. At about the same time, Ryder wrote three letters to The Daily Telegraph in response to Brophy's arguments. Brophy read Ryder's letters and put him in touch with the Godlovitches and John Harris, who had begun to plan a book about the issue which was also partly inspired by Brophy's polemic. The philosophers had also been to see Brophy about the possibility of a book of essays on the subject. They initially thought that a book with contributions from Brophy, Ruth Harrison, Maureen Duffy, and other well-known writers might be of interest to publishers, but after an initial proposal was turned down by the first publisher they approached, Giles Gordon of Victor Gollancz suggested that the work would be more viable if it included their own writing. This was the idea that became "Animals, Men, and Morals". In 1970, Ryder coined the phrase "speciesism", first using it in a privately printed pamphlet to describe the assignment of value to the interests of beings on the basis of their membership of a particular species.

Ryder subsequently became a contributor to Animals, Men and Morals: An Inquiry into the Maltreatment of Non-humans (1972), edited by John Harris and the Godlovitches, a work that became highly influential, as did Rosalind Godlovitch's essay "Animal and Morals", published the same year. It was in a review of Animals, Men and Morals for the New York Review of Books that Australian philosopher Peter Singer first put forward his basic arguments, based on utilitarianism and drawing an explicit comparison between women's liberation and animal liberation. Out of the review came Singer's Animal Liberation, published in 1975, now regarded by many as the "bible" of the movement. Other books regarded as important include philosopher Tom Regan's The Case for Animal Rights (1983); Created from Animals: The Moral Implications of Darwinism by James Rachels (1990); Animals, Property, and the Law (1995) by legal scholar Gary Francione, Rattling the Cage: Toward Legal Rights for Animals by another legal scholar Steven M. Wise (2000); and Animal Rights and Moral Philosophy by Julian H. Franklin (2005).

== Gender, class, and other factors ==
Another factor feeding the animal rights movement was revulsion to televised slaughters. In the United States, many public protest slaughters were held in the late 1960s and early 1970s by the National Farmers Organization. Protesting low prices for meat, farmers would kill their own animals in front of media representatives. The carcasses were wasted and not eaten. However, this effort backfired because it angered television audiences to see animals being needlessly and wastefully killed.

The movement predominately comprises upper-class and middle-class white female members, owing this to its associations with the Victorian English animal protection movement and American feminism and environmentalism movements. As such, the movement is widely associated in public spheres with women, femininity, and effeminacy. Public perception of the movement is influenced by gendered evaluations; movement outsiders tend to view activists as irrational by virtue of overly emotional sentiments. Aware of this, activists have strategically incorporated men into positions of leadership and theory production, in order to legitimize the movement and counter popular beliefs about the primacy of emotion in the animal rights movement. This tactic relies on the popular perception of men as rational and not given to emotion, and follows a trend in social movement activism that seeks to counter traditional associations with femininity and private spheres by emphasizing rationality, rights, and justice. In one case study, targets of anti-hunting activism used class and gender markers to evaluate activists' claims. Hunters' associations of irrationality with femininity and of inexperience in hunting and wilderness with white-collar positions constituted the reasons for their dismissal of activists' claims. In contrast, hunters framed hunting in logical, scientific, and altruistic terms, thus legitimating hunting, termed wildlife management, as a protective measure.

It has been noted that the composition of the movement may discourage the mobilization of particular demographics. A content analysis of magazine covers from highly visible animal rights organizations (PeTA and VegNews) revealed that most featured members were white, female, and thin. With this, and with the composition of the movement being mostly white, female, and thin, it has been suggested that animal rights media depict an activist ideal-type with such characteristics, and that this may mobilize thin white females while deterring others. Racialized, sexualized, and size-focused campaign tactics may also serve to deter potential members from joining the movement. Racialized tactics include the appropriation of African slavery and Holocaust language and imagery, and have been deemed insensitive and impugned by nonwhite communities. In addition, the movement has maintained racist stereotypes about nonwhite individuals' predisposition toward animal cruelty; these stereotypes arose in post-slavery U.S. and Britain, where nonwhites were deemed by law and by society to have a tendency toward animal cruelty. Sexualization of "ideal" women is used as a mobilization tactic, but reduces support for ethics-based campaigns and may be counterproductive, alienating women that do not have "ideal" body types. Sizeism is used as a tactic to frame veganism as a healthy and positive lifestyle, aligning with a popular association of fatness with moral failure. These tactics may contribute to gender inequality because unrealistic and sexualized representations of women are linked to their societal devaluation. Its lack of diverse membership may decrease the movement's legitimacy and ability to mobilize, as members of marginalized groups are more likely to mobilize when they are represented in the movement. An inclusive movement with strong group solidarity would decrease opportunity costs associated with participating (e.g., social stigmatization, lack of alternatives, legal persecution) and thus serve to increase and sustain participation in the movement.

== Current status of the movement ==
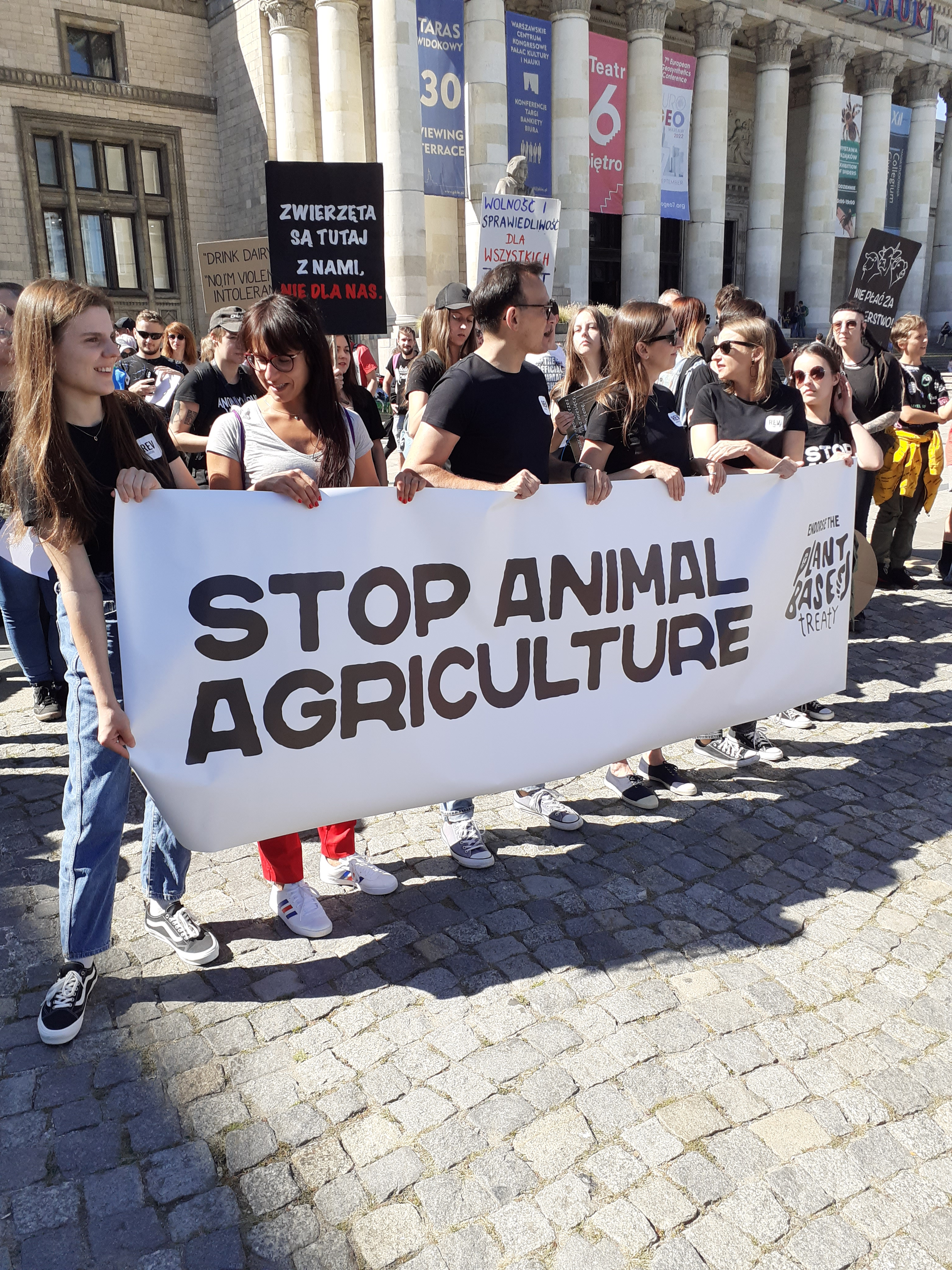
Banner carried during the Animal Liberation March in Warsaw in 2022

The movement is no longer viewed as hovering on the fringe. In the 1980s and 1990s, it was joined by a wide variety of academics and professionals, including lawyers, physicians, psychologists, veterinarians, and former vivisectionists, and is now a common subject of study in philosophy departments in Europe and North America. Animal law courses are taught in 92 out of 180 law schools in the United States, and the movement has gained the support of senior legal scholars, including Alan Dershowitz and Laurence Tribe of Harvard Law School. Chapters of animal rights law have been created in several state bar associations, and resolutions related to animal rights are regularly proposed within the American Bar Association.

In the 1980s, the movement became associated with punk subculture and ideologies, particularly straight edge hardcore punk in the United States and anarcho-punk in the United Kingdom. This association continues on into the 21st century, as evidenced by the prominence of vegan punk events such as Fluff Fest in Europe.

Michael Socarras of Greenberg Traurig told the Association of American Medical Colleges: "There is a very important shift under way in the manner in which many people in law schools and in the legal profession think about animals. This shift has not yet reached popular opinion. However, in [the U.S.], social change has and can occur through the courts, which in many instances do not operate as democratic institutions. Therefore, the evolution in elite legal opinion is extremely significant ..."

In the Netherlands, the animals rights movement is mainstream and politically represented by the Party for the Animals (PvdD), which currently holds 3 out of 150 seats in the lower house of parliament. With industrial cattle farming being a significant industry in the Netherlands, the party often finds itself at odds with the Farmer-Citizen Movement (BBB), a conservative pro-farmer party.

== Philosophical and legal aims ==
The movement aims to include animals in the moral community by putting the basic interests of non-human animals on an equal footing with the basic interests of human beings. A basic interest would be, for example, not being made to suffer pain on behalf of other individual human or non-human animals. The aim is to remove animals from the sphere of property and to award them personhood; that is, to see them awarded legal rights to protect their basic interests.

Who are we that we have set ourselves up on this pedestal and we believe that we have a right to take from others everything—including their life—simply because we want to do it? Shouldn't we stop and think for a second that maybe they are just others like us? Other nations, other individuals, other cultures. Just others. Not sub-human, but just different from being human.

Liberationists argue that animals appear to have value in law only in relation to their usefulness or benefit to their owners, and are awarded no intrinsic value whatsoever. In the United States, for example, state and federal laws formulate the rules for the treatment of animals in terms of their status as property. Liberationists point out that Texas Animal Cruelty Laws apply only to pets living under the custody of human beings and exclude birds, deer, rabbits, squirrels, and other wild animals not owned by humans, ignoring that jurisdiction for such creatures comes under the domain of state wildlife officers. The U.S. Animal Welfare Act excludes "pet stores ... state and country fairs, livestock shows, rodeos, purebred dog and cat shows, and any fairs or exhibitions intended to advance agricultural arts and sciences." There is no mention in the law that such activities already fall under the jurisdiction of state agriculture departments. The Department of Agriculture interprets the Act as also excluding cold-blooded animals, and warm-blooded animals not "used for research, teaching, testing, experimentation ... exhibition purposes, or as a pet, [and] farm animals used for food, fiber, or production purposes".

The Seattle-based Great Ape Project (GAP), founded by Peter Singer, is campaigning for the United Nations to adopt its Declaration on Great Apes, which would see chimpanzees, gorillas and orangutans included in a "community of equals" with human beings. The declaration wants to extend to the non-human apes the protection of three basic interests: the right to life, the protection of individual liberty, and the prohibition of torture.

== Legal changes influenced by the movement ==
Regarding the campaign to change the status of animals as property, the animal liberation movement has seen success in several countries. In 1992, Switzerland amended its constitution to recognize animals as beings and not things. However, in 1999 the Swiss constitution was completely rewritten. A decade later, Germany guaranteed rights to animals in a 2002 amendment to its constitution, becoming the first European Union member to do so. The German Civil Code had been amended correspondingly in 1997.

Perhaps the greatest success of the animal liberation movement has been the granting of basic rights to five great ape species in New Zealand in 1999. Their use is now forbidden in research, testing or teaching. Other governments had also previously implemented a ban on these experiments, such as the UK government in 1986. Some other countries have also banned or severely restricted the use of non-human great apes in research. Also, on 17 May 2013, India declared that all cetaceans have the status of "nonhuman persons".

In the United States, there is an Animal Welfare Act that was produced in 1966. This law protects animals in acts of research, transportation, and sale. Generally, animals are protected from any torture, neglect, or killing. There have been many amendments made towards this act to keep it updated. While there is only one act covering the entire United States, there are more current laws surrounding animal rights, which vary by state.

== Strategy and tactics ==
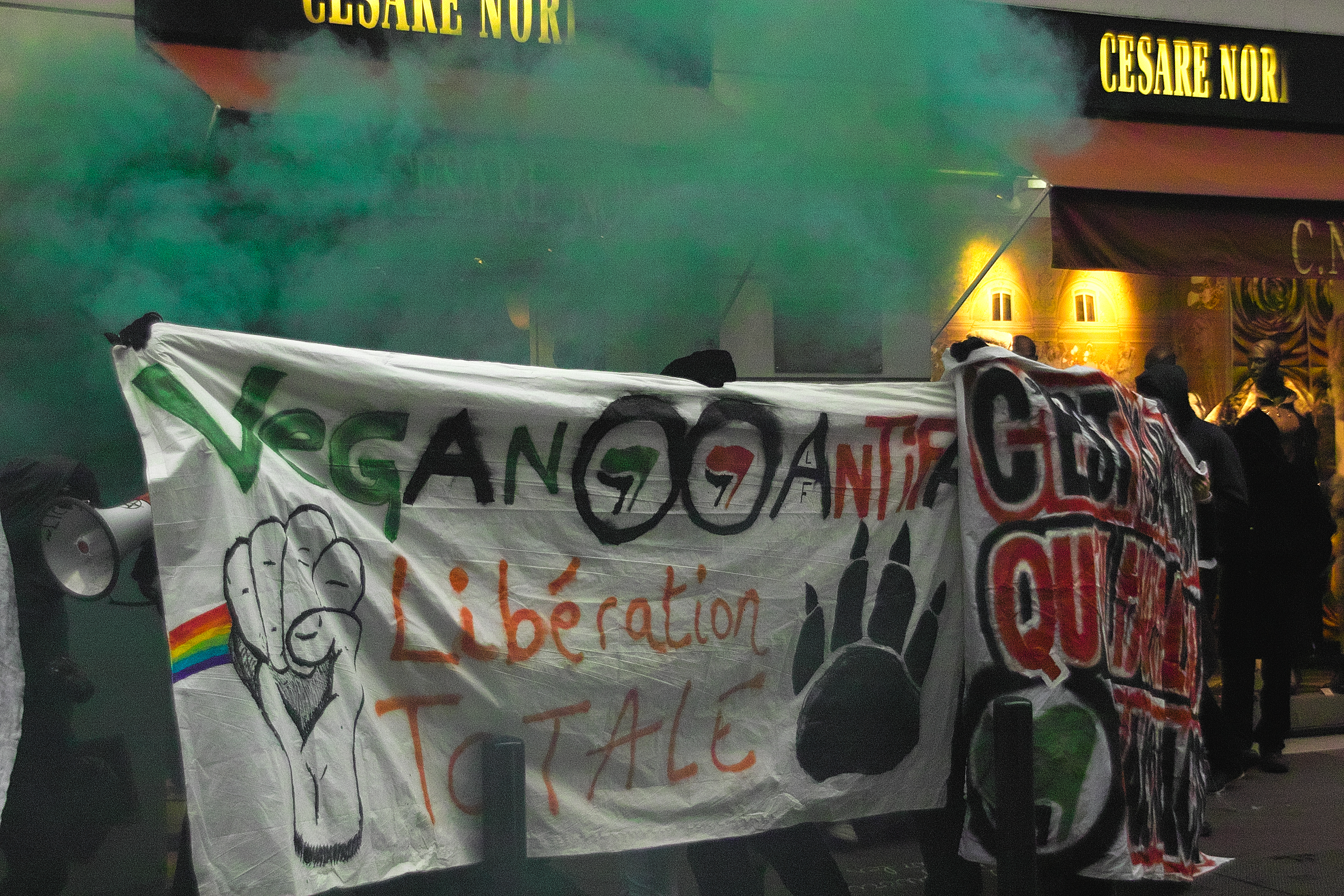
Anarchists and anti fascists protesting for animal liberation

=== Use of new information communication technologies (ICTs) ===
New media, such as the Internet and email, have been used by Animal Rights Movement actors and countermovement actors in a variety of capacities. Radical factions in the movement rely on websites, blogs, podcasts, videos, and online forums to engage in vegan outreach and other mobilization efforts and build alliances, thus overcoming exclusion by dominant factions. The use of Internet has allowed the animal rights movement to spread transnationally. For example, the Istanbul Animal Rights Movement's theory and activities draw from those of various countries that have spread through the use of Internet. The Internet is also used by activists to build community and avoid stigmatization, and may be a preferred means of activism for marginalized members, such as individuals who are fat.

In 2001, Stop Huntingdon Animal Cruelty (SHAC), an animal rights group founded in the UK with the aim of ending vivisection practices by Huntingdon Life Sciences (HLS), published the names of targets associated with HLS on its website. SHAC.net listed targets for "naming and shaming", emphasized and sent email action alerts, and facilitated written and digital communication between activists and targets. When the UK government later prevented SHAC from publishing reports from the ALF on its website, an activist created the Bite Back website, which was registered in the US and thus allowed the ALF to publish reports without reprisal. Countermovement actors have also used ICTs; law enforcement officers have tracked SHAC activists and admitted electronic communications as evidence in criminal trials. Dylan Barr, who jammed email inboxes at Washington Mutual Bank with 5,000 emails, caused $5,000 in losses and was convicted for extortion.

ICTs have facilitated undercover surveillance efforts by activists who use video cameras, Internet, and television to collect and disseminate evidence of cruelty to animals, in order to attract publicity to and mobilize support for the movement.

=== Undercover surveillance ===
In 1981, animal rights released footage unethical conditions of monkeys in a research laboratory in Silver Spring, Maryland. Police raided the research facility, and because the activists had notified media of the raid, it was televised, attracting publicity to the activists' cause. In the UK in 1990, Mike Huskisson and Melody McDonald videotaped Wilhelm Feldberg performing illegal research; the video evidence was made public and Feldberg's lab was summarily closed down. SHAC was founded after Zoe Broughton conducted undercover surveillance of vivisectionists and discovered evidence of nonhuman animal abuse. Footage and images from undercover surveillance activity are often circulated offline and on the Internet and used to deliver a moral shock that will mobilize viewers to participate in the movement. Members in the abolitionist faction, specifically those in Francione's camp, argue that the graphic depictions of suffering discovered in undercover work result in a focus on treatment, as opposed to use, and that this focus, while useful in securing welfare reform, is counterproductive to abolishing animal exploitation.

=== Boycott ===
Animal liberationists usually boycott industries that use animals. Foremost among these is factory farming, which produces the majority of meat, dairy products, and eggs in industrialized nations. The transportation of farm animals for slaughter, which often involves their live export, has in recent years been a major issue for animal rights groups, particularly in the UK and Scandinavia.

The vast majority of animal rights advocates adopt vegetarian or vegan diets. They may also avoid clothes made of animal skins, such as leather shoes, and will not use products known to contain animal byproducts. Goods containing ingredients that have been tested on animals are also avoided where possible. Company-wide boycotts are common. The Procter & Gamble corporation, for example, tests many of its products on animals, leading many animal rights advocates to boycott the company's products entirely, whether tested on animals or not.

There is a growing trend in the American movement towards devoting all resources to vegetarian outreach. The 9.8 billion animals killed there for food every year far exceeds the number of animals used in other ways. Groups such as Vegan Outreach and Compassion Over Killing devote their time to exposing factory-farming practices by publishing information for consumers and by organizing undercover investigations.

=== Moral shocks ===
Moral shock is a tactic that involves drawing viewers' attention to a particular depiction of a situation in order to cause outrage and catalyze targets to support a movement or claim. In the Animal Rights Movement, moral shocks are often used in the form of graphic depictions that detail the brutalization of nonhuman animals. Farm Animal Rights Movement (FARM), a popular animal rights organization, has used moral shocks in its pay-per-view campaign, in which passersby were paid a dollar to watch a graphic video of nonhuman animal suffering. Nonhuman animals depicted in moral shocks often display characteristics similar to those of human infants (e.g., large heads and eyes, crying or whimpering, small, mammalian). There is an ongoing debate within the Movement about the effectiveness of moral shocks. It has been found that many animal rights activists join after being exposed to moral shocks, and that moral shocks given to strangers are more likely to mobilize potential participants than are preexisting social networks; there is research that has found the opposite, however. Conversely, moral shocks that target the public at large (e.g., those used in vegan outreach) are less likely to be effective than those that have targets more distant from and less visible to the public (e.g., vivisectors).

=== Non-violent action ===
Non-violent resistance or civil disobedience consists of violating the law without using violence. This may include the blocking of public roads or entrances, sometimes by chaining or gluing oneself to the ground or to doors. The animal rights movement has espoused these tactics during the 2019 Animal Rebellion protests in London, leading to several dozen arrests.

=== Direct action ===
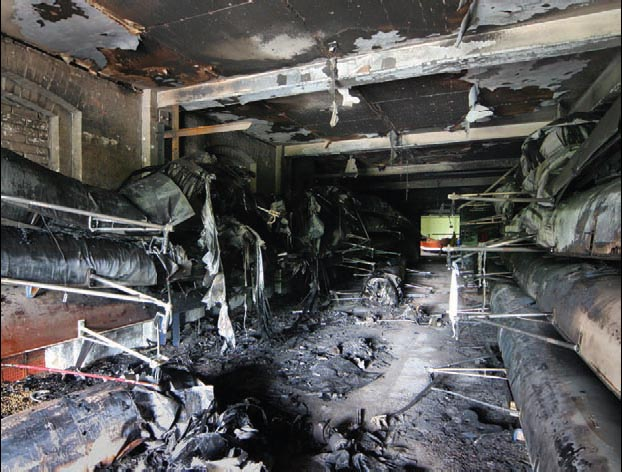
A fire, claimed by the Oxford Arson Squad, caused £500,000 damage to Londbridges boathouse, Oxfordshire on 4 July 2005.

The movement espouses a number of approaches, and is bitterly divided on the issue of direct action and violence, with very few activists or writers publicly advocating the latter tactic as a justified method to use. Most groups reject violence against persons, intimidation, threats, and the damage of property: for example, the British Union for the Abolition of Vivisection (BUAV) and Animal Aid. These groups concentrate on education and research, including carrying out undercover investigations of animal-testing facilities. There is some evidence of cooperation between the BUAV and the ALF: for example, the BUAV used to donate office space for the use of the ALF in London in the early 1980s.

Other groups concentrate on education, research, media campaigns, and undercover investigations. See, for example, People for the Ethical Treatment of Animals (PETA).

A third category of activists operates using the leaderless resistance model, working in covert cells consisting of small numbers of trusted friends, or of one individual acting alone. These cells engage in direct action: for example by carrying out raids to release animals from laboratories and farms, using names like the Animal Liberation Front (ALF); or by boycotting and targeting anyone or any business associated with the controversial animal testing lab, Huntingdon Life Sciences (HLS), using a campaign name like Stop Huntingdon Animal Cruelty (SHAC). Some arson, property destruction and vandalism has been linked to direct action animal rights groups

Activists who have carried out or threatened acts of physical violence have operated using the names; Animal Rights Militia (ARM), Justice Department, Revolutionary Cells—Animal Liberation brigade (RCALB), Hunt Retribution Squad (HRS) and the Militant Forces Against Huntingdon Life Sciences (MFAH).

Some activists have attempted blackmail and other illegal activities, such as the intimidation campaign to close Darley Oaks farm, which involved hate mail, malicious phonecalls, bomb threats, arson attacks and property destruction, climaxing in the theft of the corpse of Gladys Hammond, the owners' mother-in-law, from a Staffordshire grave. Over a thousand ALF attacks in one year in the UK alone caused £2.6M of damage to property, prompting some experts to state that animal rights now tops the list of causes that prompt violence in the UK.

There are also a growing number of "open rescues", in which liberationists enter businesses to remove animals without trying to hide their identities. Open rescues tend to be carried out by committed individuals willing to go to jail if prosecuted, but so far no farmer has been willing to press charges.

=== Targeting researchers ===
Direct action activists often target individual researchers, using methods such as threatening. Nevertheless, the wide majority of animal rights groups reject those tactics in favor of non-violent methods, and the movement often claims that occasional instances of violence have been used in efforts to try to tarnish the entire movement.

== Criminalization of direct action methods ==
The U.S. Justice Department labels underground groups the Animal Liberation Front and the Earth Liberation Front as terrorist organizations. A 13 November 2003 edition of CBS News' 60 Minutes charged that "eco-terrorists", a term used by the United States government to refer to the Animal Liberation Front and Earth Liberation Front, are considered by the FBI to be "the country's biggest domestic terrorist threat". John Lewis, a Deputy Assistant Director for Counterterrorism at the FBI, stated in a 60 Minutes interview that these groups "have caused over $100 million worth of damage nationwide", and that "there are more than 150 investigations of eco-terrorist crimes underway". "Animal Enterprise Terrorism Act", the legislation which allows federal authorities to "help prevent, better investigate, and prosecute individuals who seek to halt biomedical research through acts of intimidation, harassment, and violence" was adopted in the USA in 2006. It has also been described as having 'a chilling effect' on free speech.

== Inter-movement activity ==
Animal rights factions address injustices against a variety of groups, therein emphasizing a connection between discrimination against humans and discrimination against nonhuman animals. An intersectional orientation is seen online, on websites and social media, and also in offline activity. In Turkey, animal rights groups commonly join other social movements by aligning with online and offline campaigns. In Istanbul's 2013 Gezi Park protests, which began as an environmental movement against urban development efforts, various social movement groups participated. Among them were animal rights activists that saw the protests as an opportunity to raise concerns about speciesism. Animal rights activists' involvement in the protests changed the opinions of animal rights movement outsiders who had previously viewed vegan animal rights activists as elitist. This allowed for increased legitimacy and network expansion; the animal rights movement in Istanbul is composed of multi-movement actors from the feminist movement, LGBT+ movement, and antimilitarist movement, and such inter-movement interaction has led to increased coverage of veganism and animal rights by leftist news sites in Turkey.

== Countermovement ==
Opposition to the animal rights movement comes primarily from corporate and state actors. Mass media, agribusiness, and biomedicine industries often portray activists in a negative light, characterizing the movement as misanthropic, sensationalist, and dangerous to scientific endeavors and human well-being because of activists' high levels of expressed empathy for nonhuman animals. Mass media also frequently portray nonhuman animals as objects. Major pharmaceutical companies have taken legal measures to disallow protestors from targeting their companies.

The abolitionist faction of the animal rights movement often faces counterframing by dominant reformist organizations of the movement that frame abolitionist activism as idealistic and schismatic. These reform-oriented nonhuman rights organizations often exclude abolitionist arguments in decision-making and advocacy activities. Another example of counterframing from opposition movement actors is found in Switzerland's 1998 referendum cycle, in which antivivisectionists' claims that animal research should be abolished were contested with claims that mobilized the public more. Antivivisection claims, which framed animal research as facilitating the genetic engineering of foods in hopes of seizing on public fear of genetic engineering, were countered by scientists and animal researchers, who framed vivisection as medically necessary to ensure human well-being.

== See also ==
- Abolitionism (animal rights)
- Animal–industrial complex
- Animal research
- Animal resistance
- Animal rights
- Critical animal studies
- Cruelty to animals
- Humanitarian movement
- International Primate Day
- List of animal rights advocates
- Open rescue
- Veganism
