= Social movement organization =

Organized component of a social movement

A social movement organization (SMO) is an organized component of a social movement.

SMOs are generally seen as the components of a social movement. The movement's goals can be much more narrow, or much broader, than the SMOs' goals.

== Description ==
The term SMO entered literature through the work of Mayer N. Zald and Roberta Ash (Zald, Mayer N. and Roberta Ash, Social Movement Organizations: Growth, Decay and Change. Social Forces 44:327-341, 1966). In social movement theory, a social movement organization is an organized component of a social movement (SM). An SMO is usually only a part of a particular social movement; in other words, a specific social movement is usually composed of many social movement organizations – formal organizations that share the movement's goals. Social movement organizations usually have coordinating roles in social movements, but do not actually employ or direct most of the participants, who are part of a wider social movement community. Social movement organizations carry out the tasks that are necessary for any social movement to survive and to be successful.

== Examples ==
The civil rights movement was a social movement composed of specific social movement organizations such as the Student Nonviolent Coordinating Committee (SNCC), the Congress of Racial Equality (CORE), and the National Association for the Advancement of Colored People (NAACP). These are just three SMOs amongst the hundreds of organizations that helped shape the civil rights movement.

Similarly we can consider Veganism, where organizations such as People for the Ethical Treatment of Animals (PETA) advocate for vegan lifestyles along with its other aims. But PETA is not the only group to advocate for vegan diets and lifestyles; there are numerous other groups actively engaged toward this end. Thus, the social movement is the general push toward veganism (an effort with numerous motivations) and PETA is only a single SMO working within the broader social movement.

The peace movement is composed of many groups that want peace – groups that classify as SMOs such as Peace Action (SANE/FREEZE), Fellowship of Reconciliation and others. The Ku Klux Klan is yet another SMO – part of the white supremacist movement. Al-Qaeda, acting as a coordinating body for a large number of loosely connected anti-American organizations and individuals, is another example of a social movement organization.

== Social Movement Industry (SMI) ==
An organizational equivalent of a particular social movement – a collection of all SMOs focused on a given field – is known as a Social Movement Industry (SMI). Social Movement Industries are similar to social movements in scope but are seen as having more structure. Social movement industries can be combined into one Social Movement Sector in the society.

== See also ==
- Interest group
- Community organization
