= Political opportunity =

Approach of social movements

Political opportunity theory, also known as the political process theory or political opportunity structure, is an approach of social movements that is heavily influenced by political sociology. It argues that success or failure of social movements is affected primarily by political opportunities. Social theorists Peter Eisinger, Sidney Tarrow, David S. Meyer and Doug McAdam are considered among the most prominent supporters of the theory.

== Description ==
Three vital components for movement formation are the following:

1. Insurgent consciousness: certain members of society feel deprived, mistreated, and have grievances directed at a system that they perceive as unjust (see also deprivation theory). When a collective sense of injustice develops, it motivates people to become movement members. Movement activists do not choose their goals at random, but the political context stresses certain grievances around which movements organize.
2. Organizational strength: similar to the main argument of the resource mobilization theory, the argument here is that the social movement must have strong and efficient leadership and sufficient resources. The political opportunity theory has much in common with the related resource mobilization theory, particularly when it is seen as focusing on mobilization of resources external to the movement. Associated and indigenous organizations also play a major role in recruiting and motivating actors to join and participate within social movements. Often, the rise of a movement merges with other pre-existing and highly-organized blocs of individuals, who lend the movement resources and support. The more heavily that individuals are integrated into disconnected but otherwise mobile communities, the higher the likelihood of those communities merging and lending support to causes that their members are active in.
3. Political opportunities: if the existing political system is vulnerable to a challenge, it creates an opportunity for others, like the movement members, to issue such a challenge and try to use this opportune time to push through a social change. The vulnerability can be the result of:
  1. Increasing political pluralism
  2. Decline in repression
  3. Division within elites, particularly when it grows to a point where some support organized opposition
  4. Increased political enfranchisement

Political opportunity theory argues that the actions of the activists are dependent on the existence or the lack of a specific political opportunity. There are various definitions of political opportunity, but Meyer (2004) stresses that of Tarrow (1998):

"consistent – but not necessarily formal or permanent – dimensions of the political struggle that encourage people to engage in contentious politics".

From the three components there emerges a proponent term which Doug McAdam coined as cognitive liberation, the ability for those active in political protest to recognize their collective strength and take advantage of political opportunities as they become available to them. As political opposition to the movement's demands weakens, members may feel a collective sense of symbolic efficacy, the capacity to enact significant change within the political arena. This opens up significant opportunities for movements to both recruit members and mobilize under a concentrated and effective cycle of demands.

Over time, the broad socioeconomic processes develop, maintain and cause decline within the movement. A movement, once developed, may be affected by the level of social control placed on it, which, in turn, affects its ability to mobilize and maintain members since when the movement's demands are portrayed as underdeveloped or unattractive, they risk losing or failing to receive support from outside institutions.

Furthermore, movements may be affected by oligarchization, a class of individuals within the movement working to ensure the maintenance of the movement itself, rather than a continual push for collective goals, or co-optation, when outside support is garnered for the movement at the same time as it is forced to sacrifice its goals to meet the demands of those supporting institutions. That, in turn, may lead to the loss of indigenous support and, along with it, many of the supporting grassroots organizations that were able to quickly mobilize members at the onset of the movement.

Meyer (2004) credited Eisinger (1973) with first use of the political opportunity theory framed in such a way (traces of which, of course, go further back). Eisinger asked why in the 1960s, the level of riots about race and poverty varied between different places in the United States and noted that lack of visible openings for participation of repressed or discouraged dissident made riots more likely. Thus, the inability to air grievances legally was the political opportunity which led to organization and the mobilization of movements expressing their grievances by rioting.

Meyer (2004), in his overview of political opportunity theory, noted that this broader context can affect:

- "mobilizing",
- "advancing particular claims rather than others",
- "cultivating some alliances rather than others",
- "employing particular political strategies and tactics rather than others", and
- "affecting mainstream institutional politics and policy".

A key advantage of the theory is that it explains why social movements emerge and/or increase their activity at a given time. When there are no political opportunities, simply having grievances (organizational consciousness) and resources is not enough. It is only when all three of these components are present that the movement has a chance to succeed.

== Comparison with political structure ==
Within the structure and agency debate, actions of activists (agents) can be understood only when they are seen in the broader context of political opportunities (structure). The term structure has been used to characterize political opportunities in older scholarship. A political opportunity structure has been defined as the circumstances surrounding a political landscape. However, Tarrow, who used the term in his earlier publications, now argues it is misleading, as most opportunities need to be perceived and are situational, not structural. Rather than just a political landscape, political opportunity structures can be described as a specific configuration of resources, institutional arrangements and historical precedent for social mobilizations. Political opportunity structures are prone to change and can alter in days or last for decades. Demographics and socioeconomic factors create "structure" that affects political actors.

== Political mediation model ==
One side model, based on the political opportunity theory, is known as the political mediation model. The political mediation model focuses on how the political context affects the strategic choices of the political actors. The model goes beyond looking at whether the movements just succeeded or failed and analyzes other consequences, including unintentional ones as well as collective benefits.

The opposite of political opportunity is a political constraint.

== Criticism ==
The political process model has been criticized both structurally and conceptually. Critics suggest that political process theorists use overly-broad definitions as to what constitute political opportunities, and those definitions vary widely based on the historical context of the social movement itself. Furthermore, as political process theory frames movements as legally or politically detached from the state, it ignores movements that form out of cultural solidarity or do not directly stand in opposition to extant rules or regulations. Critics contend that theorists place too great an emphasis on the role of social networks and often almost entirely ignore the cultural underpinnings that allow the networks to form and subsist.

In response to some criticisms, Doug McAdam, Sidney Tarrow and Charles Tilly proposed the Dynamics of Contention research program, which focuses on identifying mechanisms to explain political opportunities, rather than relying on an abstract structure.

== Examples ==
MoveOn.org is an organization that started in 1998 and still operates. MoveOn.org is a progressive organization that specifically centers on political issues. MoveOn.org allows viewers to start their own petitions, a form of collective behavior, which could potentially start a social movement of its own. MoveOn.org also includes other petitions and political articles and video clips on the front page for people to sign and view as a mechanism for people to assemble over a similar issue, perpetuating the concept of solidarity, or a sense of collective identity over political discourse. MoveOn.org can also be applied to resource mobilization theory since MoveOn.org is a site that is meant to assemble people, which adds to the strength and success of the organization.

== See also ==
- Opportunism
- Legal opportunity structure
- Social movement impact theory

== Sources ==
- Meyer DS, Minkoff DC. 2004. Conceptualizing political opportunity. Soc. Forces.
