= Collective benefits =

A collective benefit often benefits more than one person at the cost of an individual acting to obtain the benefit. It is common that an individual may benefit from a collective act without contributing to it. Collective benefits can non-competitive and inclusive if the availability of the benefit does not diminish from the use of one actor. An example of this type of collective benefit is social capital. However, they can also be exclusive if the benefit is not available to all networks of relation, such as a pure public good.
