= Resource mobilization =

Sociological theory in social movements

Resource mobilization is the process of getting resources from the resource provider, using different mechanisms, to implement an organization's predetermined goals. It is a theory that is used in the study of social movements and argues that the success of social movements depends on resources (time, money, skills, etc.) and the ability to use them.

It deals in acquiring the needed resources in a timely, cost-effective manner. Resource mobilization advocates having the right type of resource at the right time at the right price by making the right use of acquired resources thus ensuring optimum usage of the same.

It is a major sociological theory in the study of social movements that emerged in the 1970s. It emphasizes the ability of a movement's members to acquire resources and to mobilize people towards accomplishing the movement's goals. In contrast to the traditional collective behaviour theory, which views social movements as deviant and irrational, resource mobilization sees them as rational social institutions that are created and populated by social actors with a goal of taking political action.

== Theory ==
According to resource mobilization theory, a core, professional group in a social movement organization works towards bringing money, supporters, attention of the media, alliances with those in power, and refining the organizational structure. The theory revolves around the central notion of how messages of social change are spread from person to person and from group to group. The conditions needed for a social movement are the notion that grievances shared by multiple individuals and organizations, ideologies about social causes and how to go about reducing those grievances.

The theory assumes that individuals are rational: individuals weigh the costs and the benefits of movement participation and act only if the benefits outweigh the costs. When movement goals take the form of public goods, the free rider dilemma must be taken into consideration.

Social movements are goal-oriented, but organization is more important than resources. Organization means the interactions and relations between social movement organizations (SMOs) and other organizations (other SMOs, businesses, governments, etc.). The organization's infrastructure efficiency is a key resource in itself.

Resource mobilization theory can be divided into two camps: John D. McCarthy and Mayer Zald are the originators and major advocates of the classic entrepreneurial (economic) version of the theory, and Charles Tilly and Doug McAdam are proponents of the political version of resource mobilization called political process theory.

The entrepreneurial model explains collective action as a result of economics factors and organization theory. It argues that grievances are not sufficient to explain creation of social movements. Instead, access to and control over resources is the crucial factor. The laws of supply and demand explain the flow of resources to and from the movements and that individual actions or the lack thereof is accounted for by rational choice theory.

The political model focuses on the political struggle, instead of economic factors.

In the 1980s, other theories of social movements such as social constructionism and new social movement theory challenged the resource mobilization framework.

== Types of resources ==
Edwards and McCarthy identified five types of resources available to social movement organizations:

- Moral: resources available, such as solidarity support, legitimacy and sympathetic support, which can be easily retracted, making them less accessible than other resources.
- Cultural: knowledge that likely has become widely but not necessarily universally known. Examples include how to accomplish specific tasks like enacting a protest event, holding a news conference, running a meeting, forming an organization, initiating a festival, or surfing the web.
- Social-organizational: resources that deal with spreading the message. They include intentional social organization, which is created to spread the movement's message, and appropriable social organization, which is created for reasons other than moving for social change. Examples include spreading flyers, holding community meetings, and recruiting volunteers.
- Material: includes financial and physical capital, like office space, money, equipment, and supplies.
- Human: resources such as labor, experience, skills and expertise in a certain field. More tangible than some of the others (moral, cultural and social-organizational) and easier to quantify.

== Criticism ==
Critics point out that resource mobilization theory fails to explain social movement communities, which are large networks of individuals and other groups surrounding social movement organizations and providing them with various services. Critics also argue that it fails to explain how groups with limited resources can succeed in bringing social change and that the theory does not assign sufficient weight to grievances, identity and culture as well as many macrosociological issues.

== Examples ==
=== Civil Rights Movement ===
Aldon Morris claims that the resource mobilization theory is a possible explanation of the surge of the Civil Rights Movement in the United States. The rise of the movement was not because black Americans felt at the same time a frustration that led to a rebellion, Instead, it was the mobilization and organization of the leaders that triggered the movement. Some of the leaders that Aldon Morris reframed are Rosa Parks and Martin Luther King Jr., who, combined with the efforts of the NAACP, the SCLC, the SNCC, CORE and small business, labor unions, students' organizations and faith communities, led to the civil rights movement. The organizations together mobilized vast resources together, rather than individually, leading to the massive mobilization of people fighting for the same objective. The research done by Aldon Morris demonstrates that social movements depend on the ability of empower the less powerful people: "the civil rights movement managed, against overwhelming odds and historical tradition, to push for reform of oppressive and rigidly racist cultural repertoires, practices and laws that had denied African Americans basic civil rights."

=== MoveOn.org ===
MoveOn.org is a social movement organization to which resource mobilization theory can apply because it is a platform for people to sign a petition or to start a new petition. Coupled with the political process theory, a social movement theory that posits that social movements either succeed or fail because of political opportunities, MoveOn.org has been a successful tool because of its accessibility, which would make people more likely to start a petition and move toward a common goal. In other words, resource mobilization applies to MoveOn.org because the website itself is an existing resource that is accessible to consumers of the Internet, which helps mobilize the goals of the organization, and that mobilization is essential to MoveOn.org's success. Also, resource mobilization applies because the people who founded the organization knew how to use the resources available, which implies that anyone who uses the website to sign or start a petition is a rational social actor, who acts as a utility maximizer, who compares the costs and the benefits before deciding to be a part of a social movement.

=== Arab Spring ===
The Arab Spring is another example. Born in Tunisia in December 2010, growing unrest spread through Egypt, Syria, and Yemen. Researchers studying resource mobilization through the Egyptian revolution of 2011 found a reliance on social media to spread social action messages while the governments worked to censor the media and cut off those countries from the rest of the world by severing the internet. The activists in those countries were communicating with one another through social media platforms like Twitter to co-ordinate protests, keep tabs on each other and spread the social change messages. The researchers noted the Egyptian Revolution demonstrated the use of social media to spread messages of social change rapidly and to mobilized large groups of people. Another group of researchers studying social movements in Tunisia during the Arab Spring found that cyberactivism sprung from grievances on increasing government restrictions on Internet use for political purposes, coupled with the lack of socioeconomic opportunities.

== Connection with other fields ==
Resource mobilization theory has been studied in conjunction with other fields, such as framing theory. Evidence has been found of an evolving relationship between framing processes and social movements. The relationship has led to the identification of two frames used in social movement stories: diagnostic, which involves identifying the sources of causality or blame for the situation, and prognostic, which lays out a plan of attack on how to create social change.

== See also ==
- Mass mobilization
- Social movement organization
