= List of Jewish American activists =

This is a list of notable Jewish American activists. For other Jewish Americans, see Lists of Jewish Americans.

== A ==
- Dinah Abrahamson (1954–2013), politician and activist for the African-American Lubavitch community
- Martin Abern (1898–1949), communist youth movement leader
- Bernard Ades (1903–1986), civil rights lawyer
- Lori Alhadeff (born 1975), school safety activist
- Saul Alinsky (1909–1972), community activist and theorist
- Gloria Allred (born 1941), lawyer and radio talk show host
- Lindsay Amer, LGBTQ YouTuber and activist
- Stanley Aronowitz (1933–2021), sociologist, civil rights activist, and labor leader

== B ==
- Ady Barkan (1983–2023), founding member of the Center for Popular Democracy and progressive activist on monetary policy and healthcare issues
- Michael Berg (born 1945), environmental activist and Green Party candidate
- Heather Booth (born 1945), civil rights activist and community organizer
- Esther Swirk Brown (1917–1970), civil rights activist whose landmark supreme court case ended segregation in American schools in 1958, separate does not mean equal

== C ==
- Judi Chamberlin (1944–2010), American activist, leader, organizer, public speaker and educator in the psychiatric survivors movement
- Maximilian Cohen, American Socialist Party leader
- Zipporah Michelbacher Cohen (1853–1944), American civic leader

== D ==
- Serge Dedina, environmental activist and politician

== E ==
- Adam Eli (born 1990), LGBTQ activist and writer

== F ==
- Abraham Feinberg (1899–1986), anti-Vietnam war activist
- David B. Feinberg (1956–1994), novelist and AIDS activist with ACT UP
- Leslie Feinberg (1949–2014), communist butch lesbian transgender organizer.
- Ada Fisher (1947–2022), physician and perennial issues candidate
- Jennie Miller Faggen (1874-1968), American philanthropist and strong supporter of Orthodox Jewish institutions.
- Raffi Freedman-Gurspan (born 1987), LGBTQ activist and first openly transgender White House staffer
- Betty Friedan (1921–2006), feminist writer and women's movement activist
- Sandra Froman (born 1949), President of the National Rifle Association (NRA), second female president and first Jewish president

== G ==
- Marshall Ganz (born 1943), civil rights and labor activist, lecturer at the Kennedy School of Government at Harvard University
- Alicia Garza (born 1981), civil rights and Black Lives Matter activist
- Joseph Gelders (1898–1950), Alabama physicist and activist who cofounded the Southern Conference for Human Welfare and the National Committee to Abolish the Poll Tax
- Pamela Geller (born 1958), pro-Israel activist, author, commentator
- Samuel Gompers (1850–1924), labor leader who founded the American Federation of Labor (AFL) and served as its first president
- Andrew Goodman (1943–1964), civil rights activist who was murdered by the Ku Klux Klan in Philadelphia, Mississippi, while working with the Congress of Racial Equality (CORE) during Freedom Summer 1964
- Sally Gottesman, consultant for non-profits
- Jack Greenberg (1924–2016), attorney, legal scholar, and activist who served as Director-Counsel to the NAACP Legal Defense Fund

== H ==
- Morris Hillquit (1869–1933), labor lawyer, a central founder and leader of the Socialist Party of America
- Abraham Joshua Heschel (1907–1972), Polish-American rabbi and participant in the Selma to Montgomery marches during the American Civil Rights Movement
- Abbie Hoffman (1936–1989), prominent anti-war activist during the 1960s counterculture movement, and member of the Chicago Seven
- Judith Heumann (1947–2023), internationally recognized disability rights activist who was known as the "Mother of the Disability Rights Movement"
- David Horowitz (1939–2025), conservative writer and activist
- Dario Hunter (born 1983), environmental activist attorney and first Muslim-born man to be ordained a rabbi

== J ==
- Rashida Jones (born 1976), actress, director, writer, and peace activist

== K ==
- Franklin E. Kameny (1925–2011), gay rights leader
- Shabbos Kestenbaum (born 1999), antisemitism activist
- Sue Klebold (born 1949), suicide prevention activist
- Larry Kramer (1935–2020), LGBT rights activist and playwright
- Julie Kushner (born 1952), trade union organizer

== L ==
- Sandra Lawson (born 1970), social justice activist and the first ever openly gay black female rabbi
- Karen Lewis (labor leader) (1953–2021), educator and labor leader
- Leon L. Lewis (1888–1954), attorney and spy who infiltrated and disrupted American Nazi movements before and during World War II, and who served as the first national secretary of the Anti-Defamation League
- Ben Linder (1959–1987), engineer and internationalist murdered by Contras while working on hydroelectric projects in Nicaragua
- Mark Levin (born 1957), host of a syndicated radio show and a show on Fox News, who worked in the administration of President Ronald Reagan and as a chief of staff for Attorney General Edwin Meese.

== M ==
- Kenneth L. Marcus, attorney and activist who founded the Louis D. Brandeis Center for Human Rights Under Law and former Assistant Secretary of Education for Civil Rights in the administration of President Donald Trump.
- Henry Moskowitz (1880–1936), civil rights activist and co-founder of the National Association for the Advancement of Colored People (NAACP)

== P ==
- Frances Fox Piven (born 1932), political scientist, sociologist, and welfare rights activist
- Chanda Prescod-Weinstein (born c. 1982), cosmologist, science writer, and equality activist
- Dean Preston (born 1969), member of San Francisco Board of Supervisors, civil rights attorney and tenant rights advocate

== R ==
- Michele Singer Reiner (1955–2025), photographer, film producer, and LGBTQ+ rights activist
- Rob Reiner (1947–2025), actor, director, producer, writer and anti-tobacco activist; son of Carl Reiner
- Shais Rishon, rabbi and anti-racism activist
- David A Rose (judge) (1906–1995), activist for human rights and against anti-Catholic and anti-Jewish bias
- Zelda Rubinstein (1933–2010), actress and human rights activist

== S ==
- Max Shachtman (1904–1972), American Marxist and labor activist
- Rose Schneiderman (1882–1972), sociologist, feminist activist, and labor union leader
- Sarah Schulman (born 1958), writer, historian, and LGBTQ activist
- Michael Schwerner (1939–1964), civil rights activist who was murdered by the Ku Klux Klan in Philadelphia, Mississippi, while working with the Congress of Racial Equality (CORE) during Freedom Summer 1964
- Robert E Segal (1903–1995), activist for displaced people; for housing for Puerto Ricans against discrimination and against anti Semitism.
- Tony Serra (born 1934), criminal defense and civil rights attorney, political activist and tax resister
- Norman Siegel (born 1943), civil liberties activist and attorney
- Michael Signer, attorney and politician
- Arthur Spingarn (1878–1971), attorney and activist who served as the third president of the NAACP
- Joel Elias Spingarn (1875–1939), literary critic and activist who served as the second president of the NAACP
- Gloria Steinem (1934–2026), journalist and activist, a major figure in second-wave feminism in the United States
- Aaron Swartz (1986–2013), internet hacktivist who campaigned against SOPA

== W ==
- Naomi Wadler (born 2006), student activist against gun violence
- Louis Waldman (1892–1982), labor lawyer and founding member of the Social Democratic Federation
- Rebecca Walker (born 1969), feminist writer
- Bret Weinstein (born 1969), biology professor and free speech advocate
- Shatzi Weisberger (1930–2022), nurse, death educator, and activist who provided care to people suffering from AIDS, organized with ACT UP, and participated in numerous other activist movements
- Harold Willens (1914–2003), anti-nuclear weapons activist

== See also ==
- Jewish left
