= Lists of activists =

This is a list of lists of activists.

- List of abolitionists
- List of African-American abolitionists
- List of African American activists
- List of animal rights advocates
- List of animal rights groups
- List of anti-nuclear groups
- List of anti-war organizations
- List of assassinated human rights activists
- List of atheist activists and educators
- List of breastfeeding activists
- List of Chinese dissidents
- List of civil rights leaders
- List of disability rights activists
- List of environmental organizations
- List of feminists
- List of Indian independence activists
- List of Jewish American activists
- List of LGBT rights activists
- List of Muslim feminists
- List of Nigerian human rights activists
- List of opponents of slavery
- List of Pakistan Movement activists
- List of peace activists
- List of suffragists and suffragettes
- List of women's rights activists
- List of women pacifists and peace activists
- List of women climate scientists and activists
