= Esther Brown =

Esther Brown may refer to:

- Esther Brown (pensioner), Scottish pensioner and murder victim
- Esther Lucile Brown (1898–1990), American social anthropologist
- Esther Swirk Brown (1917–1970), American civil rights activist
