= Countermovement =

In sociology, a social movement opposed to another social movement

A countermovement in sociology means a social movement opposed to another social movement. Whenever one social movement starts up, another group establishes themselves to undermine the previous group. Many social movements start out as an effect of political activism towards issues that a group disagrees with. “Researchers have used resource mobilization to study all manner of social and political movements such as environmentalism, father's rights groups, religious movements, and abortion rights”. The reason for the start of countermovement groups is that people are competing for resources for political influence. Countermovement groups are a part of American society that try to compete for government legislation to support their own views.

The resource mobilization theory is an important issue in countermovements. “Research mobilization theory was a response to social psychological theories that focused on grievances and viewed movements as collective identities”. This theory suggests that social movements organize their resources to make changes in society that fits in their views. As a social movement starts growing, there are those who oppose their views and in time start countermovements. For example, anti-abortion and abortion rights movements are countermovements to each other. There are countermovements relating to fathers’ rights, religion, and war. These movements and countermovements will never have a resolution so they try to pass their views into government legislation. Countermovements main goal is to oppose the other movement to get their views into the mainstream. Many of these movements try to recruit people to gain popularity and in time gain political support.

In some cases an apparent countermovement group may be crerated deliberately by a party with a financial stake, a process known as Astroturfing. The Global warming countermovement is one example.

== Environment ==
An example of a countermovement has to deal with the environmental issues. Even with scientific facts and statistics that global warming exists, there are still groups that disagree that our environment is changing. As Jacques states, "the reality of doubt in environmental problems is not due to science, but has to deal with politics--global politics to be specific". Many who are “environmental skeptics” are saying that there are no environmental problems that will threaten humanity. Many of these skeptics are blaming environmentalist for stopping human progress to make standard of living rise. Environmentalists on the other hand blame factions within right-wing politics for this skepticism and becoming an anti-environmental countermovement. Jacques explains that, "The concentration of skeptical claims from the 1990s onwards indicates an intense burst of interest in the environmental skeptical program and is consistent with a conservative countermovement against global environmental concern".

== Fathers' rights movement ==
Fathers’ Rights Groups have become a growing issue in American society. In response to the perceived high number of violent crimes committed against women by their male partners, the battered women’s movement (BWM) has been campaigning for greater awareness of domestic violence. (p. 723) With the widespread understanding that domestic violence is a serious problem in the United States and elsewhere, the BWM has found public support to create “tougher penalties against offenders and public vigilance against potential batterers, including fathers from dissolving families” (p. 723). At least partly in response to this, there has been a counter-movement of activists from the fathers’ rights movement (FRM) who argue that the battered women’s movements have created laws that targets men unfairly. Fathers’ rights groups have grown in numbers since the 1980s in Canada, the United Kingdom, Sweden, Australia, and the United States (p. 727). The fathers’ rights movement has argued that the legal system is making it difficult for them to be 'good fathers.' The FRM employs the argument that being a biological father is different from being a social father because a biological father is simply the individual who makes a genetic contribution, while a social father is one who engages in all of their children’s activities (p. 727) The FRMs "have tapped into the emerging cultural notion that in the healthiest families fathers are involved in all aspects of their children's daily lives.(p. 727).

== Abortion ==
The most controversial of countermovements are about whether abortion should be legal or not, which is fought by anti-abortion and pro-abortion groups. The anti-abortion group is opposed to abortion under most grounds, notably those "on request". Some anti-abortion proponents believe abortion to be justifiable when serious health issues are present for the mother, while other proponents believe that abortion is unjustifiable under any circumstance. The pro-abortion group believes that a woman has a right to abortion under all circumstances, often citing human rights do not encompass fetuses before fetal viability. Both of these groups tend to be adamant towards their views and neither sides' arguments seem to convince towards otherwise. “Although the issue of abortion is very controversial, most surveys indicate liberalization of public attitudes towards pregnancy termination between 1965 and the years immediately following Roe v. Wade Supreme Court decision which legalized abortion. Recent polls demonstrate that between 80% and 90% of Americans approve of abortion in the case of poor health, defective fetus, or rape, and between 40% and 50% indicate approval for other reasons. Only 10% would like to prohibit abortion under all circumstances”. There is also information that people who are usually pro-abortion or anti-abortion come from very different backgrounds and have different values. “Sociodemographic analyses indicate that individuals who disapprove of abortion are usually committed to organized religion, such as Roman Catholicism or fundamentalist Protestants, are usually very traditional/conservative with regard to women’s role in life, and are less educated than those who are pro-abortion”. Both groups will create logical fallacies because both of these countermovements will not agree to each other's issues. Both of these countermovements try to use emotional appeal by “abortion advocates tie their cause to the importance of ‘choice’, while anti-abortion activist point out the significance of protecting all forms of life”.

== Conclusion ==
In summary, countermovements have been a part of every movement. Many of the countermovements have tried to stop the opposing movements to get rid of their movement and control the politics of the issue. All countermovements are competing for resources whether it is political influence, money, or enforcing their doctrine on others. No matter the movement that comes up now or in the future, there is another group who will disapprove and make a countermovement.

== See also ==
- Anti-cult movement
- Reactionary
