= Shatzi Weisberger =

American nurse and death educator (1930–2022)

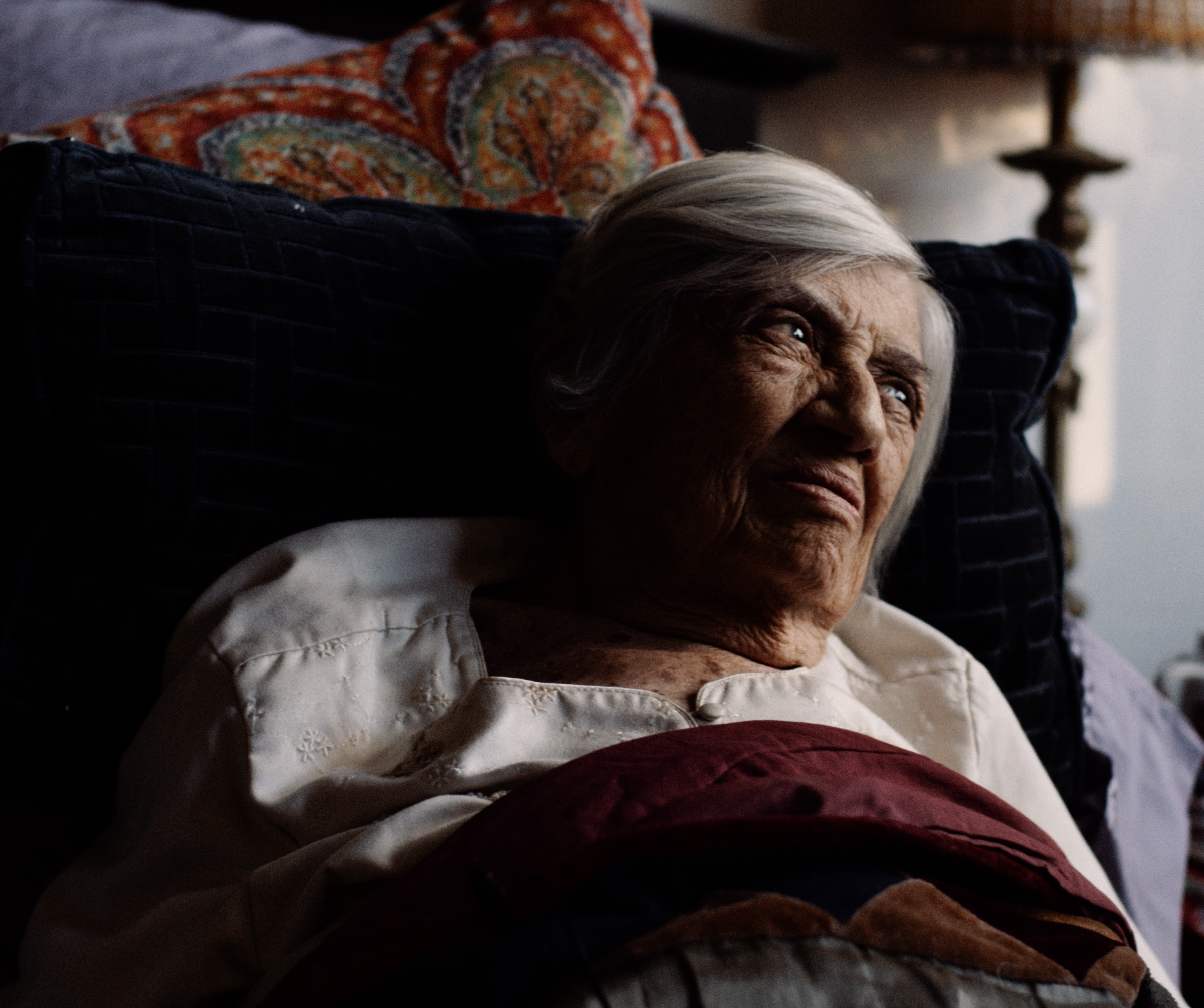
- Weisberger in 2022, shortly before her death
- Born: Joyce Schatzberg; June 17, 1930; Brooklyn, New York, U.S.
- Died: December 1, 2022 (aged 92); Brooklyn, New York, U.S.
- Resting place: Rosendale, New York, U.S.
- Occupations: Death educator; Activist; Nurse
- Organizations: ACT UP; Jewish Voice for Peace
- Spouse: Gene Weisberger (m. 1951; sep. 1969)
- Children: 2
- Relatives: Samuel Gompers (great-grandfather)

Joyce "Shatzi" Weisberger (née Schatzberg; June 17, 1930 – December 1, 2022) was an American death educator, activist, and nurse based in New York City. After a 47-year career in nursing, she began engaging in public death education and end-of-life advocacy. Throughout her life, Weisberger was involved in several activist movements, including the civil rights movement, anti-nuclear movement, ACT UP, and campaigns against police brutality. In her later years, she was affiliated with the New York chapter of Jewish Voice for Peace, expressing opposition to Zionism.

== Early life ==
Shatzi Weisberger was born as Joyce Schatzberg in Brooklyn on June 17, 1930. She did not have a close relationship with her parents and was once kidnapped by her father after her mother came out as a lesbian. She grew up in a small apartment with her mother and her partner, unaware of their romantic relationship of more than 40 years. She spent time in the foster care system due to her father's homophobia. She attended summer camp as a child.

Weisberger's great-grandfather was Samuel Gompers, a founder of the American Federation of Labor.

== Career ==
Weisberger worked as a nurse for 47 years, specialising in both obstetrics and end-of-life care. Her nursing career coincided with the peak of HIV/AIDS-related deaths in New York City during the 1980s, a period during which she provided home care for individuals dying from the disease.

Weisberger began her nursing career after obtaining a master's degree in psychiatric nursing. However, she later became critical of the psychiatric practices at the time, which she described as unethical. This led her to speak publicly about the need for mental health care reform.

In the 2010s, after being present during a close friend's death, she turned her focus to death education and advocacy. She took a five-month, 70-hour course in Thanatology at the Open Centre, and a course in hospice care with the New York City visiting service. She then started holding workshops on "the art of dying". She organized "death cafés"—informal gatherings that aimed to foster open conversations about mortality and dying in a supportive environment.

== Activism ==
Weisberger was a political lesbian, a member of ACT UP, and a part of the public opposition to nuclear technology as a member of Dykes Opposed to Nuclear Technology. She was also an organiser with the Independence Party of New York City (which broke away from the Independence Party of New York) for 25 years.

Weisberger's activism began with direct action against racist redlining on Long Island during the Civil Rights era. One of Weisberger's earliest acts of activism took place at a queer die-in in New York City during the AIDS crisis, where she cried because she felt that she was "in the right place doing the right things with the right people".

Weisberger attended numerous protests and demonstrations in New York, leading The Advocate to describe her as "a fixture". She was active in protests against police brutality in the United States, supported abolition of the police and of prisons, and was associated with anti-Zionism. She became known for her protest signs, such as one reading "Jewish dyke standing with Palestinian queers".

In 2021, Weisberger cited her age as a positive contributor to her activism, explaining that her presence "brings attention to the issues that matter" and expressing an intent to participate in "as many demonstrations as I possibly can".

=== Nuclear Weapons ===
Weisberger faced arrest as a result of her actions against nuclear weapons, forming Radical Jewish Lesbians Organizing and Dykes Opposed to Nuclear Technology (DONT) in the 1970s.

=== ACT UP ===
In the 1980s, Weisberger joined the AIDS Coalition To Unleash Power, known as ACT UP. At the time, many people treated the disease as something easily transmittable, leading to people dying alone or having few, if any, visitors. She states in an interview that this began her advocacy for people with HIV/AIDS, whom she visited in their homes to provide care.

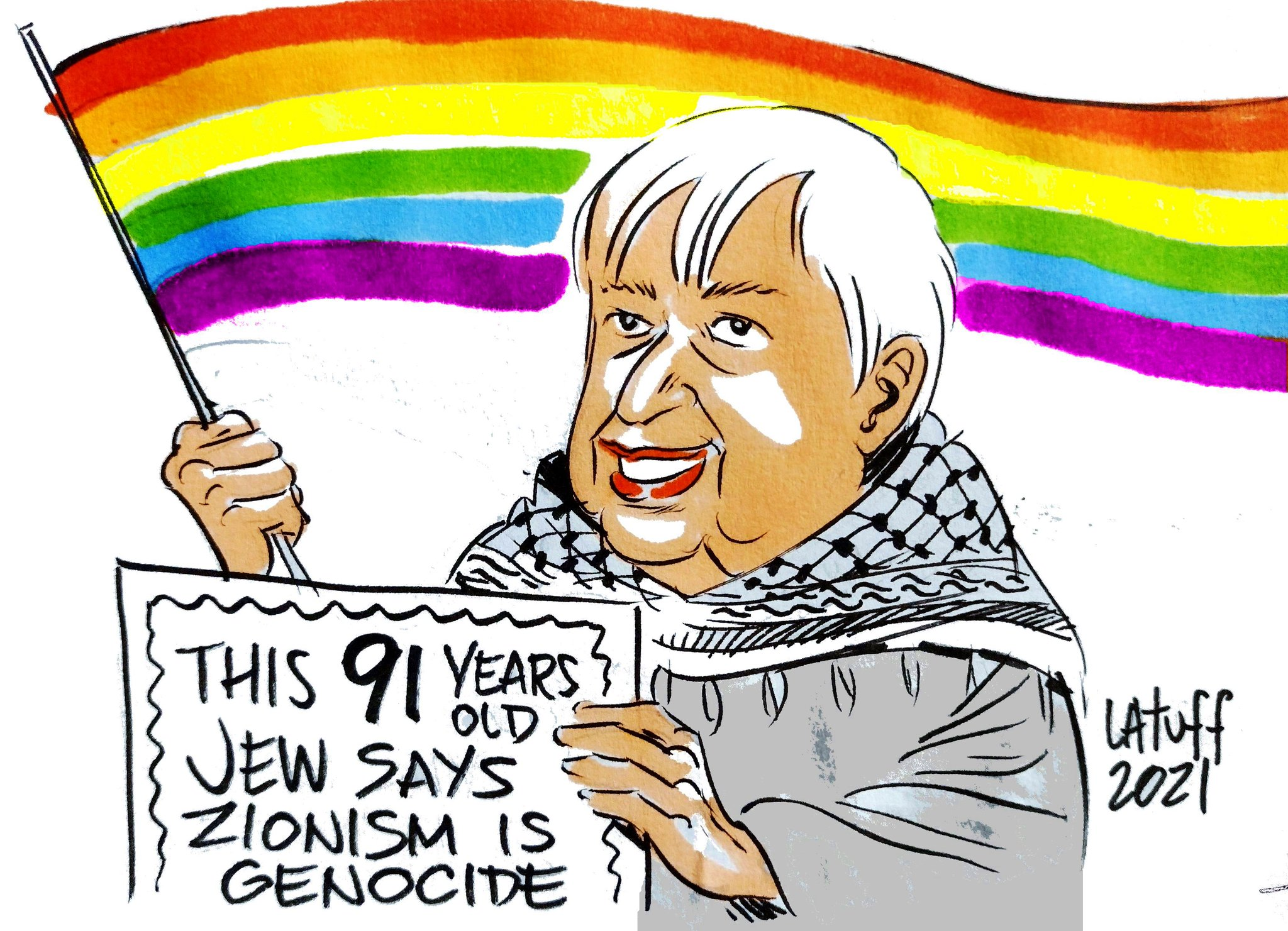
Cartoon portrait by Carlos Latuff, depicting Weisberger holding a protest sign

=== Police Brutality ===
Weisberger wrote a column in HuffPost stating that she wanted the police to be abolished for her 90th birthday, and that the "only way all people will ever be able to live and die as they wish is if we pursue abolition.” On that day, she participated in a Black Lives Matter protest, in which she was dubbed "the people's bubbie" (a Yiddish term for a grandmother). During the Covid-19 pandemic, she broke curfew for elderly people to attend another Black Lives Matter protest. She would also go out alone to protest with a Black Lives Matter sign attached to her walker.

=== Zionism ===
For some time, I thought Israel could reform itself. But I don't believe that at all anymore. I realized that I can't be a Zionist. No way. It is such an injustice, such cruelty and such distortion.

— Weisberger, as quoted in Middle East Eye

Weisberger grew up as a Zionist; she hoped to travel to Israel and live on a kibbutz. She later described this as the result of "brainwashing" during her childhood. She stated that around 1983, someone suggested that she read a book whose title she no longer remembered, and it led her to begin questioning her views on Zionism and eventually to oppose the ideology entirely. This took place roughly a year after the Shatila massacre.

As she became associated with the anti-Zionist movement, Weisberger worked with the Palestinian Solidarity Committee, founded by Rabab Abdulhadi, staffing their literature table at various events. She also led Palestine-related workshops at the Michigan Womyn's Music Festival. She worked to build the political consciousness of other Jewish lesbians, arguing in a 1986 issue of WomaNews that "Jewish women in particular need to educate ourselves about the history of Zionism."

Weisberger was a member of Jewish Voice for Peace and associated with its New York City chapter for the last six years of her life. She told Middle East Eye in 2021 that being part of a community of Jewish anti-Zionists made it "much easier to protest against Zionism than it was before."

== Later life and death ==
In her later life, Weisberger was diagnosed with macular degeneration and required the use of a walker to remain mobile. She was unable to take the New York City Subway, instead using the paratransit service Access-A-Ride to get to protests. She sang as part of the Brooklyn Women's Chorus. Asked about her "secret to longevity" in an interview for Glorious Broads, she cited dietary supplements, always being passionately engaged in a project, avoiding stress, drinking green tea, and smoking marijuana every night.

In 2018, Weisberger held a "FUN-eral" for herself in the common room of an Upper West Side apartment building. Guests decorated a cardboard coffin, ate and sang, and Weisberger spoke about death and dying. Wearing a colorful floral blouse for the occasion, she said that she wanted to experience her death and "to share the experience with anybody who’s interested". She told John Leland of The New York Times that she had worried she might die before hosting the funeral.

Weisberger experienced symptoms of a heart attack in 2020 during the COVID-19 lockdown in New York. Rather than going to a hospital, she stayed home and recovered there.

In April 2022, Weisberger told the LGBTQ&A podcast that she hoped to have time to experience the dying process in her own home; items in her house were tagged with the name of the person to whom she wanted to bequeath them. She expressed a desire for people to say their goodbyes and pick up their bequeathed items before she died, and did not wish to be drugged. She planned to be buried in a forest in Upstate New York. She had additionally preselected a funeral director and a shroud.

After being diagnosed with untreatable pancreatic cancer in October 2022, Weisberger called Leland the following month, inviting him to report on the end of her life (and asking him to bring her a cannabis edible). On November 18, she told Leland that she was getting her wish of experiencing the process of dying, and that while she was in extreme pain and unable to sleep she was "experiencing the best time of [her] life".

In preparation for her death, Weisberger contacted her estranged son. She attempted to do the same with her daughter, who was unwilling to reconnect. Despite difficulty caused by a labor shortage and high costs, she secured in-home hospice care with the aid of friends and a GoFundMe created by Jewish Voice for Peace. By November 21, she was in the company of friends and hospice care, and on that day, two film crews came to her apartment and Vogue was working on a profile of her. Despite her wishes not to be drugged before her death, she wore a fentanyl patch to reduce pain, she had a morphine elixir but had not yet used it.

Weisberger had a "pain emergency" on November 25 and increased her dosage of pain medication. On November 30, she postponed an interview with Vogue and did not see visitors, increasing her medication again. She died at 12:40 a.m. on December 1. That same day, the New York chapter of Jewish Voice for Peace posted on Instagram that Weisberger had died the night before at her home, in accordance with her wishes. An obituary published in BuzzFeed News noted that her death was widely mourned on social media, while Them reported that a "joyous online memorial" and celebration of life was being planned. Middle East Eye quoted a post on Twitter by Egyptian activist and academic Alia ElKattan, who wrote that she had encountered Weisberger at a Palestine-related event the week before her death. Weisberger's body was oiled and bathed by a group of her close friends, and she was buried in Rosendale, New York on December 2.
