= Overpass protests =

Type of protest

Overpass protests, also known as bridge overpass protests, freeway overpass protests, or highway overpass protests are a form of activism aimed at communicating to drivers on busy roads. Particularly during the second term of Donald Trump, hundreds of groups across the United States have organized regular overpass events to display messages relevant to current news. Protesters compose a message out of large letters, hold flags, or use specialized lighting designed to be visible from the road. Because of the large volume of traffic going beneath bridges during protests, the messages are usually seen by many more people than for other forms of protest. While the legality and safety of this form of protest have occasionally been challenged, most overpass protests in 2025 and 2026 have occurred without incident.

Overpass message on a bridge in Lexington, Massachusetts on May 20, 2026

== History of protests on bridges ==
Bridges have been the site of some historic clashes between protesters and those opposing them. The Battle of the Overpass in 1937 pitted United Auto Workers aiming to distribute information about unionizing the Ford Motor Company against security forces hired by the company. Many union organizers were injured in the battle. In 1965, protesters calling for civil rights for Black Americans were injured by state troopers and local opponents of civil rights laws when they attempted to cross the Edmund Pettus Bridge as part of the Selma to Montgomery marches.

An early example of the use of a bridge as a venue for displaying protest messages was organized by the Overpass Light Brigade in Milwaukee, Wisconsin in 2011. Wide adoption of the approach has been seen throughout the United States, particularly in 2025 and 2026.

Visibility Brigade protesters attach letters to a fence on a highway overpass along the Minuteman Bike path in Lexington, Massachusetts on August 6, 2025

== Overpass protests in the twenty-first century ==
Overpass protests have become prevalent in the United States, particularly during the second presidential administration of Donald Trump. The Visibility Brigade was founded in 2020 and now has chapters in most US states with California alone having over 75 chapters. Their organization cites that the movement was born in Paramus, New Jersey in frustration about the lack of real-world physical messaging while the nation was facing an existential crisis. Other groups organizing bridge protests include the New Hampshire Bridge Brigade, North Carolina's Triangle Unified Bridge Brigade, the Boston Bridge Brigade as well as various chapters of the progressive activist groups Indivisible and Third Act. Among the overpass protests that occurred on September 10 and 11, 2026 were events in Sacramento, California, San Jose, California, Tolland, Connecticut, Sarasota, Florida, Mount Vernon, Maryland, Greenfield, Massachusetts, Coralville, Iowa, Franconia, New Hampshire, Lawrenceville, New Jersey, Providence, Rhode Island, Vancouver, Washington, Seattle, Washington, and Wilder, Vermont. Images from these protests were incorporated into Robert Hubbell's "Today's Edition" Newsletter on September 12, 2026. Hubbell regularly features images of protests submitted by readers at the end of each day's newsletter.

Because of the large volume of traffic going beneath bridges during protests, the messages are viewed by more people than some other forms of protest. Protesters sometimes try to estimate the number of cars that passed under the bridge while their signs were up and the number of honks or flashes of headlights they received in acknowledgement of the message. They also sometimes have tried to compare the number of honks from drivers supporting the message to the number of vulgar hand gestures coming from drivers who disagree.

== Extending the message via social media ==
Overpass protest visibility is extended when organizers photograph or use video capture of the signs from road level and distribute the images via Facebook, Instagram and other social media platforms. Sharing and reposting of these images by others who are in the posters' network or are "tagged" in the post can grow the audience further. For instance, a Visibility Brigade post on Bluesky from September 11, 2026 "tagged" popular historian Heather Cox Richardson who chose to repost it to her large audience.

== Legal and safety concerns ==
Law enforcement officers concerned with highway safety have sometimes attempted to stop protesters using highway overpasses as protest venues. In 2025, Connecticut State Police were issuing citations and in one case arrested an overpass protester. The ACLU Foundation of Connecticut sued Connecticut's Department of Transportation on the basis that the protesters' First Amendment rights to free speech were being suppressed. In a settlement, the state's commissioner of public safety agreed to issue an order limiting state troopers from breaking up highway overpass demonstrations.

A study by the Carolina Journal (published by the John Locke Foundation) suggested that more rear-end crashes on the highway were occurring during the times when protesters were on bridges in the area, and opined that the increase was due to driver distraction caused by the protesters. Organizers of the protests quoted in the article found limitations with how data was captured which they thought undermined the study's conclusions. They compared the distraction of reading a large protest sign to being similar to reading a highway billboard and pointed out that the latter have always been considered acceptable.
