= Gays Against Guns =

Group of LGBTQ people committed to ending gun violence

- Formation: 2016
- Founder: Kevin Hertzog, Brian Worth and John Grauwiler
- Type: direct action group

Gays Against Guns (GAG) is a direct action LGBTQ group supportive of gun control, with the intent to use nonviolent means, civil disobedience, and activism to further this aim. The group was founded by Kevin Hertzog, Brian Worth and John Grauwiler in 2016, as a result of the Pulse nightclub attack in Orlando, Florida which had killed 49 people and wounded 53 others in a mass shooting. It is the deadliest incident of violence against LGBTQ people in U.S. history and the deadliest terrorist attack in the U.S. since the September 11 attacks in 2001.

Two weeks after the June 2016 attack, a group of activists presented a large banner made by Gilbert Baker, inventor of the rainbow flag, stating “Gays Against Guns”, and led the New York City LGBT Pride March. Their contingent of 750 marchers, plus 49 veiled in white, staged die-ins along the 5th Avenue route and introduced their “Human Beings”, people dressed in white with white veils representing the gun violence victims. They also had a second massive banner stating "Republican Hate Kills." Within two months the group had over 300 New York City members, and chapters in nine cities across the U.S. They were going to go after gun manufacturers, including Smith & Wesson and Sturm, Ruger & Co. the two largest gun companies, gun lobbyists, their shareholders, and corporate backers. In an October 2017 Teen Vogue op-ed, GAG's social media director posited that gun violence is a disease that can be treated and cured.

== Opposition to the National Rifle Association ==
From the beginning the group included veterans of ACT UP, a famous LGBTQ direct action group, and set an intention to take action in opposition to the National Rifle Association of America (NRA), one of the most influential lobbying groups in Washington, D.C. Part of the strategy was to target where the NRA would get its funds, including from corporations like Wyndham Hotels and Resorts, The Hertz Corporation, and FedEx. In early 2018 they staged protests at FedEx's Manhattan corporate headquarters and local chapters targeted stores across the country. The nationwide protests took place on the 26th of each month to bring attention to the 26% discount FedEx gave to NRA members. In October 2018 FedEx cut ties with the NRA.

The group has staged die-ins at money managers BlackRock, one of the largest funders of gun makers. Starting at a local park, the protesters followed people draped in white veils holding placards honoring victims of gun violence. The protesters had signs with “Gun$ sell. People die. $tock soars.” At BlackRock, no one from the company would come out so they staged a die-in, twelve people laid down, representing the twelve people killed in the 2012 Aurora, Colorado shooting. The participants were given white chalk outlines and surrounded with red popcorn to represent the spilled blood. Said a campaigner, “They’re smart enough to acknowledge they profit from massacres but can’t find a way to unload those stocks? That’s amoral.” Other companies targeted include MetLife and Visa Inc. GAG warns companies to drop the NRA or lose the LGBTQ communities’ business, which was estimated at $917 billion in 2017.

== Art components ==
Their campaigns include both a direct action component and an art component that expresses the groups sensibilities. After the February 2018 Stoneman Douglas High School shooting, which killed 17 people, GAG members traveled to Florida to offer support. At Rockefeller Center GAG sang adapted carols to Christmas shoppers. They also advocate for gun control laws. In February 2019, for Valentine's Day, they protested to draw attention to pending gun legislation in the United States Capitol, in addition to their Human Beings, a group dressed in red formed a giant broken heart on the ground. Other LGBTQ groups including Human Rights Campaign and Pride Fund to End Gun Violence, which formed in response to Pulse club massacre, also call for gun control. In March 2018 they staged a protest outside the NRA's headquarters in Fairfax, Virginia, where they sang Broadway showtunes with modified lyrics. March 2018 GAG set up a fashion runway at the March for Our Lives, a student-led demonstration in support of legislation to prevent gun violence, planned by student organizers from Never Again MSD in collaboration with Everytown for Gun Safety. GAG encouraged the estimated 800,000 people to note “These politicians act so ridiculous, so we're going to show them just how ridiculous they really are,” while ‘sashaying away’, recalling the famous RuPaul line from RuPaul's Drag Race when contestants lose the final lip sync challenge.

== Protests and campaigns ==
In 2016 GAG protested CrossFit Games, where prizes included handguns, and firearms manufacturer SIG Sauer in New Hampshire. In July 2016, to protest Donald Trump on the first night of the Republican National Convention, GAG staged an action at Trump Tower. In August 2016, the newly formed D.C. chapter protested the National Shooting Sports Foundation. The Los Angeles chapter, which started at this time, pulled inspiration from the Flower Power photograph. In February 2017 they held a protest to honor the victims of the Stoneman Douglas High School shooting. In March 2017 GAG's first advertising campaign was launched in opposition to The Concealed Carry Reciprocity Act of 2017. In April 2017 GAG's Orlando, Florida chapter was launched. In June 2017 GAG held a protest and memorial at Stonewall Inn to mark the one year anniversary of the Pulse massacre, and the Emanuel African Methodist Episcopal Church shooting in Charleston, South Carolina. In November 2018 they held a protest rally to honor the twelve Thousand Oaks shooting victims. Gays Against Guns is also the subject of a forthcoming documentary, directed by Paul Rowley of Still Films.

== See also ==
- Brady Campaign
- Dickey Amendment
- Everytown for Gun Safety
- Moms Demand Action for Gun Sense in America
- Pink Pistols
