= Anti-environmentalism =

Anti-environmentalism is a set of ideas and actions that oppose environmentalism as a whole or specific environmental policies or environmental initiatives. Criticism of environmentalism originates from multiple ideologies, interest groups, and political objectives. Oppositions can take the form of an organized countermovement, aimed at scientific claims about climate change, environmental policies and regulations, in both national or international spheres. Anti-environmentalist actors may include workers in industries and companies that are threatened by environmental policies, and anti-environmentalist think tanks.

The reasons for opposition vary. They range from economic interests to ideological and political positions that are hostile towards environmental social and political change, including critical perspectives that encourage environmentalists to think about more inclusive approaches toward sustainability.

== History ==
Criticism of environmentalism has taken different forms in different historical periods. Many oppositions to environmentalism have arisen within the environmental movement itself, from the internal contrasts and debates.

During the 1960s and 1970s, environmentalism was inspired by concerns about resource scarcity and over-exploitation: fear of the future well-being of humanity in relation to the planets health. This concept is known as neo-Malthusianism. These ideas came under criticism from neoclassical economists, who felt that the role of scientific and technological innovation in securing additional resources was overlooked. Some challenged the reliability of mathematical models, including that of the famous Club of Rome's Limits to Growth Report: critics argued that it had not adequately considered feedback and the effects of human decisions. Criticism also came from the left, for example from thinkers such as Murray Bookchin, who attributed environmental problems to political and social causes rather than natural resource scarcity. Marxist critics argued that environmentalist ideas, influenced by neo-Malthusianism, had racist, elitist, and imperialist overtones, and considered them reactionary.

Meanwhile, business interests affected by the rapidly expanding environmental legislations formed alliances to counter it. These coalitions reflected the same methods of social and environmental movements: community-level mobilization and collaborative partnerships, as well as public awareness campaigns, media engagement, research publications, and providing testimony during hearings.

During the 1980s, environmentalism gained traction as a social and political force in many Western countries. National environmental legislation and international environmental initiatives grew in response to scientific findings. Oppositions arose against perceived excesses among environmentalist positions (e.g., against apocalyptic visions of the future). Radical and organized oppositions also arose in the form of countermovements.

The 1990s witnessed the full emergence of public relations applied to environmental issues. The corporation-led coalition-building efforts from the 1970s continued to expand. Some corporations even went beyond their corporate allies by hiring specialized PR firms to establish front groups, creating the illusion of grassroots support for corporate interests to persuade politicians to oppose environmental reforms. Environmental public relations, often referred to as greenwashing, has become a lucrative industry for PR firms. Tactics that were enacted to defend Tobacco companies by minimizing or denying health effects are applied today by the fossil fuel industry; in some instances employing the same actors. American companies now invest hundreds of millions of dollars annually in greenwashing and strategic counsel, which involves shaping public and governmental perceptions of environmental problems and devising strategies to counter environmentalists and regulations. Misinformation around climate change is spread via think tanks, political actors, influencers, conservative media creating information echo chambers.

The United States, which since the 1970s had first developed models of environmental legislation later imitated around the world, has repeatedly seen the rise of pressure and initiatives to reduce environmental legislation among Republican politicians and administrations.

For example, President George W. Bush stated in his campaign platform that he would "ensure that the federal government, which is the country's largest polluter, complies with all environmental laws" and that the United States would even exceed the set standards. Once elected though, Bush verged from what he had promised during his campaign, and instead reversed the initiatives of the previous Clinton administration on drinking water, and advocated for oil exploration in protected regions. Bush's administration also moved forward in withdrawing its support of the Kyoto Protocol, a worldwide global warming agreement created in 1997. Bush stated that he would work with allies to the United States to reduce greenhouse gases, but would not carry out a plan that would "harm the economy" and "hurt American workers".

The conflict between support and opposition to environmental policies has become an important factor in the growing social and political polarization in the United States.

== Anti-environmentalist movements and ideologies ==
Anti-environmentalism is fueled by both social and economic reasons and ideological positions. The ideological underpinnings of anti-environmentalism can be very diverse and sometimes opposed to each other: from neoliberal to anti-capitalist ideologies.

In some contexts, especially in the United States, anti-environmentalist social movements and initiatives are frequently inspired by conservative or neoliberal political ideologies: these favor a free market economy over government regulation. Such political positions find support in corporate interests that feel threatened by environmental concerns or environmental regulations. Although many observers of anti-environmentalism point out the frequent association between these initiatives and specific business interests threatened by environmental policies, others consider that there are cultural factors in certain social groups that underlie their anti-environmentalism.

For example, a study of the American right has suggested that many of the anti-environmentalist positions are rooted in its traditional distrust, widespread within the right-wing electorate, of government intervention, its support for the free market as a symbol of the American dream, and its defense of Christian values, family, white identity and traditional masculinity. This resistance is fueled by concern about political and cultural changes resulting from the social movements of the 1960s out of which environmentalism emerged. Some anti-environmentalist positions may arise from genuine anxiety related to the consequences of environmental regulations feared for the economic well-being of families and communities. Opposition to environmentalists may also be widespread among social sectors that see environmentalists as linked to urban life, alienated from local realities and knowledge, and closer to specialized knowledge.

Many experts argue that ideological explanations of anti-environmentalism, based on traditional concepts of the political left and right, are of little use in interpreting current political positions, especially regarding climate policies. Research in the social and political fields suggests that populist and nationalist ideologies are more relevant factors.

In Europe, anti-environmentalism is widespread in the radical right and is generally associated with typical opposition to immigration, nationalism, welfare chauvinism (i.e., social policies must favor the country's citizens), and euroscepticism. The anti-environmentalism of the radical right can be understood as a materialist reaction against the post-materialism of the left and the greens, i.e., that ideology that elevates the need for political freedom and participation, self-actualization, personal relationships, creativity, and care for the environment over the satisfaction of material needs.

The reasons behind the prevalent anti-environmentalism expressed by right-wing populists in Europe and North America are subject to debate and remain intricate. On one hand, economic and social factors play a role: a significant portion of these parties' supporters comprises individuals who have felt the economic impacts of globalization and modernization, viewing climate policies as linked to their struggles and exacerbating their situation. On the other hand, ideological considerations come into play and can be categorized in two ways. Firstly, there is a disdain for climate policies perceived as initiatives championed by liberal, globally oriented individuals who are seen as not prioritizing the nation's interests. Secondly, there is a preference for a direct connection between ordinary citizens and those in positions of power. The complexity of climate change, demanding intricate solutions, contrasts with their inclination toward simplicity. Additionally, there is a belief that figures in authority, including climate scientists and environmentalists, are influenced by special interests, fostering skepticism toward climate initiatives.

== Actors supporting anti-environmentalism ==
Opposition to environmentalism is often supported by corporations and coordinated through conservative think tanks, alongside sham public support campaigns (known as astroturfing) orchestrated by public relations firms. These actors create links between corporate interests, conservative intellectuals, and segments of the public who share conservative perspectives or are concerned about the impact of environmental policies on communities and workers in specific sectors.

Conservative think tanks or sometimes academic researchers participate in the development of anti-environmentalist analysis and policy positions. Among the intellectuals and authors who have distinguished themselves internationally are Danish academic Bjørn Lomborg, Canadian former Greenpeace activist Patrick Moore, Canadian journalist Rex Murphy, and the US commentator Vivian Krause.

Public relations firms regularly assist the communication and lobbying of large companies whose interests are affected by environmental policies. Some communications initiatives may support the establishment of social front groups capable of lobbying legislators to reduce environmental regulations. Conservative foundations and philanthropic entities that fund anti-environmental initiatives are also active in the United States.

Some of these institutional actors (e.g., Citizens for a Sound Economy, founded by entrepreneur David Koch) call themselves environmentalists and argue that traditional environmental groups have overstated environmental problems. They use green marketing techniques to convince the public of their high level of environmental responsibility. In essence, these organizations create controversial information and call it environmental or green ideology. They frequently endorse campaigns to increase access to certain resources, such as forests and mines.

Think tanks associated with companies and seemingly independent groups can present themselves as autonomous research centers capable of providing expertise (analysis and communication) valued by the mass media. The media gives them space to balance environmentalist perspectives. However, this process can lead the media to overemphasize scientific uncertainty on some environmental issues. In other words, by presenting such sources as independent and reliable, the media may unintentionally amplify the perception of uncertainty, influencing public perceptions of specific environmental issues.

Additional strategies used by corporations or support actors like PR firms and think tanks may also include: co-opting moderate environmentalists through donations, job offers, and deals, while marginalizing and alienating non-cooperative individuals, often labeling them as extremists; dirty tricks campaigns to falsely implicate environmentalists in violent actions; threat of strategic lawsuits against public participation (in the United States) to intimidate environmentalists and citizens who engage in activities such as petitioning, writing to officials, attending public meetings, organizing boycotts, or participating in peaceful demonstrations, aiming to silence critics through legal pressure.

Other conservative think tanks (e.g., Cato Institute and The Heritage Foundation) address environmental issues as part of a broader agenda, including discussions of fiscal policy, energy, monetary policy, education, health care, and global economic liberalism. They consider that many public interest or environmental regulations are counterproductive. They support judicial activism to protect civil and economic liberties, an open and competitive energy market, and the importance of consumer choice and private incentives over a public approach to address real environmental concerns.

Many conservative think tanks involved in climate change, mineral resources, and indigenous rights issues are connected to the Atlas Network. Since the 1980s, the Atlas Network has been a supporter of neoliberal ideas, promoting these through international networking and funding of conservative think tanks. The organization operates globally, encompassing hundreds of think tanks across all continents.

== Notable cases ==
=== Climate change skeptics ===
The most widespread contemporary example of organized anti-environmentalism is the climate change denial or skepticism movement. Skeptics attack the evidence for climate change. Skepticism can target the observed trend ("global warming does not exist"), the identification of causes ("warming exists, but humans are not responsible"), or the impact ("warming could be harmless or even beneficial"). This kind of skepticism is intended to fuel uncertainty about climate science: the goal is to undermine scientific discourses of environmental policy or to confuse the public and policymakers.

Another type of skepticism is so-called response skepticism, that is, skepticism directed at actions taken to address climate change. It can be associated with climate denialism, but can also be expressed without opposing the evidence of climate change ("climate change exists and is caused by humans, but the prevailing responses are wrong or overly harmful").

Climate skepticism is widespread among European parties of the far right and radical right. However, a study of the positions expressed by these parties in the European Parliament indicated that they rarely manifest climate denialism: opposition is more often directed at climate policies. Anti-environmentalist positions are intended to fuel a pro-sovereignist and anti-elite desire and speak to issues close to voters, such as economic welfare. They also include pro-environmental and pro-climate positions and support for the fight against climate change. They are accompanied by a critique of liberal climate policies as causing pollution, and of global capitalism and in favor of localism and economic nationalism.

The climate skeptic movement is supported by certain corporate or national interests that wish to maintain the profitability of economic sectors (especially those related to fossil fuels) in the face of growing environmental concerns. It also draws on anxieties about environmental protection among segments of the public that rely on fossil fuel-intensive economies. The countermovement is supported by a minority of scientists who have been visible promoters of climate science skepticism and by an extensive network of think tanks, which often also pursue other neoliberal or conservative agendas (e.g., against government regulation).

=== Libertarian movements in the United States ===
In the 1980s, the so-called "wise use" movement emerged, consisting of local groups mainly in the western part of North America. This movement emerged as a diverse alliance of ranchers, miners, loggers, hunters, off-road vehicle drivers, oil workers, and farmers who, despite their differences, united against environmentalists. They oppose public environmental management initiatives, which are perceived as authoritarian and detrimental to individual freedoms. They share the belief that a limited, non-interventionist government is more just, believing that a large bureaucracy threatens individual rights and freedoms. They support the individual right to use natural resources as part of the right to life, liberty, and the pursuit of happiness.

Their proposals include logging in national forests, revising the Endangered Species Act to eliminate protection of "non-adaptive" species such as the California condor, immediate oil extraction in the Arctic National Wildlife Refuge, and opening all public lands, including national parks and wilderness areas, to mineral and energy production. They also support the development of national parks run by private companies and civil penalties for anyone who legally challenges economic activity or development on federal lands. Some members have also supported violent actions.

== Internal criticism ==
External criticisms of environmentalism often arise from or are related to internal disputes between different currents within the movement. Over the past two decades, the environmental movement has undergone significant changes and has not only faced external criticisms but also internal challenges with the emergence of environmental justice movements, civil environmental movements, and those focused on sustainable development choices and the transformation of production and technological systems. In particular, the tension between deep or ecosystem-centered ecology (accused of anti-humanism by external opponents) and humanist or social justice-oriented environmentalists has generated new perspectives that are more attentive to the social aspects of environmental choices. The environmental justice perspective deals with the disproportionate and unjust distribution of environmental risks and harms within and among societies.

In recent years, environmental social sciences, such as environmental history, political ecology, and environmental sociology, have been growing in importance. These disciplines have contributed to a deepening understanding of the complex link between the environment and society. This progress has overcome the simplified views that often underlie anti-environmentalist positions, paving the way for new perspectives and more sophisticated approaches.The new knowledge has had a significant impact on the formulation of alternative concepts of sustainability and the practice of more conscious environmental policies.

One example of this tension relates to the application of nature conservation models inspired by North American ideals of wilderness conservation. The use of such models in different contexts has caused conflicts with local traditions of land use. This tension and the criticism of traditional conservation models have often led to an evolution of the models themselves, seeking to better integrate pre-existing relationships between local people and their land. In general, in developing countries, local environmentalist ideas and actions are not necessarily influenced by the post-materialist perspectives of Western environmentalism. For communities in these countries, environmental challenges are often linked to struggles over natural resources, as in the case of disputes between farmers and companies over timber or between rural and urban residents over water and energy. Such conflicts often focus on the environment, as poorer communities seek to preserve control over their natural resources to prevent them from being lost to increasing state control or the expanding market system.

As a result of these debates and criticisms, environmentalism is changing the way it deals with environmental science and the management of environmental problems, moving away from intransigent principled positions and accepting the complexity of the issues. This shift recognizes the uncertainties in establishing cause-and-effect relationships, especially when dealing with large-scale environmental problems. In addition, there is an increasing emphasis on understanding power dynamics, winners and losers in environmental change and legislation. Although some changes are taking place, traditional ways of thinking, such as neo-Malthusian, romantic, and catastrophist perspectives, persist in the environmental movement.

== Examples of national and local conflicts ==
=== Alberta oil sands in Canada ===
The Alberta oil sands has also been a point of contention between environmentalists and those who exclusively consider economic growth to be important. Anti-environmentalists maintain that the oil sands have improved Canada's relations with the United States as Canada is their number one foreign supplier of oil.

As well, the oil sands have brought a secure source of energy to Canada, as well as tremendous economic gains for Alberta. There are environmental efforts in place to mitigate the effects that the mining involved in operating the oil sands mine has on animal species, though some environmentalist groups are not satisfied. Environmentalist groups such as Greenpeace are concerned with the environmental, social and health impacts of mining the oil sands, particularly on First Nations communities in Alberta.

=== Standing Rock in the United States ===
The source of this conflict is that on January 25, 2016, Dakota Access announced that it received permit approval to move forward with the construction of a four-state crude oil pipeline which would transport 470,000 barrels of oil per day from North Dakota to Illinois. Anti-environmentalists defended the construction of the Pipeline as it would create thousands of jobs, make the United States more energy independent and create a more cost-effective method of transporting oil to major refining markets. The Standing Rock Sioux Tribe took issue with this as the pipeline would run through their communities, tainting their sacred land as well as contaminating their water supply. What followed in the next ten months was a response from Sioux communities, protestors and environmentalist groups in the form of peaceful protests in which over 400 arrests were made by local law enforcement. 26 Environmentalist groups responded to the event with an open letter condemning the actions of the North American banks who helped fund the pipeline, and encouraged them to stop any future payments contributing to it.

=== The Czech Republic and the Highway by-pass project ===
In 1991, Plzeň, Czech Republic experienced immense air pollution that citizens felt was the source of their health problems. The government decided they needed to build a new highway so the traffic could no longer create pollution in the city. Two different plans were created, one being the K variant which put the highway south of the city, and the S variant which would go through protected land, and would have negative impacts on rural areas as opposed to the city. This event began environmental movements in the Czech Republic that protested the S variant. In previous years, Czechoslovakia had been focused on the Soviet model of industrial expansion which lacked environmental regulation. This had effects on the environment, such as low-grade coal used in houses and by industries as well as lead gasoline used in automobiles. In the 1980s, environmental activists protested the governments lack of environmental regulation. Political campaigns thereafter became increasingly anti-environmental through media outlets and newspaper coverage. Media coverage shared statements such as "Environmentalists believe that bugs are more important than people" and "Beware of environmentalists – they are extremists." These statements created fear of environmental causes in the population.

== Situation in some countries ==
=== Canada ===
Stephen Harper: Stephen Harper criticized Canada's prior environmental policy for having high restrictions on industry, as Harper sought to industrialize. He wanted to ensure that industries could have better access to natural resources with the goal of increasing Canada's Economy. In May 2011, Harper and the Conservative Party of Canada won the Canadian federal election with a majority government, which allowed them to make significant changes to Canada's environmental policy. A bill passed May 2012 titled the "Jobs, Growth and Long-term Prosperity Act." The Harper government focused more economic growth, such as the oil industry in Alberta. Northern Alberta has oil in their tar sands and extracting it was seen by environmentalists as destruction to the environment and a source of Greenhouse gas emissions. The Harper government focused on expanding the economy over the interests of environmentalists. Also environmental groups were also deemed "extremists" by the Harper Government and listed them under the anti-terrorism strategy as a national security threat.

In 2014, Environment Canada released its annual emissions trends report, which showed that Canada was not going to meet emission reduction targets as was promised in 2009. In fact, Canada is on track to increase its emissions up until 2020. Harper's government, while committed to reducing emissions over the long term, disapproved of limiting oil and gas emissions as the price of oil rose higher.

This was consistent with Harper's decision to withdraw Canada from the Kyoto Protocol in 2011. The main reason given for this by Harper was that Canada was not having success in meeting the protocol's targets. In the following years, Harper's administration made it difficult for foreign-based environmental groups to obstruct Canadian economic growth. Environmental charities experienced frequent audits by the federal government which resulted in less productivity and being at risk of losing their charitable status. Harper also repealed a significant environmental policy which had previously been in place; the Canadian Environmental Assessment Act. Later, a new version of the act was created. In 2015, with the election of Justin Trudeau, the environment became one of Canada's main concerns, with Trudeau eventually signing the Paris Agreement in 2016, and has been aggressive at curtailing the oil and gas industry.

=== United States ===
Former President Barack Obama promised to make the United States more environmentally conscious, and implemented the Clean Power Plan, invested significantly in clean energy, and improved standards for fuel economy of vehicles; this reduced pollution and was also economical. Obama also made a joint agreement with China to reduce the emissions of both countries, and to reduce emissions in the United States by 27% by 2025. The state of environmental affairs in the United States changed drastically under the Donald Trump administration. Trump had been open about his plans to alter or withdraw entirely from many climate change and environmental agreements the United States was then involved in, such as the Paris Agreement. As this agreement is voluntary, the United States faced no penalty for declining to participate. However, as the United States is the second largest emitter of carbon after China, their lack of participation in the agreement would greatly impact global efforts to reduce carbon emissions.

While in 1999, President Bill Clinton announced that the Environmental Protection Agency (EPA) would enforce the toughest standards to date, Trump's administration instructed the Environmental Protection Agency to remove the climate change page from its website. EPA employees stated at the time that if the page were to be taken down, years of research on global warming would be gone, as well as detailed data on emissions and links to scientific global warming research. On June 1, 2017, Trump announced that the U.S. would cease all participation in the Paris Agreement on climate change mitigation. Trump stated that "The Paris accord will undermine (the U.S.) economy," and "puts (the U.S.) at a permanent disadvantage."

=== China ===
In China, the city of Maoming became the focus of an environmental dispute in 2014, relating to the municipal government-sponsored Para-Xylene (PX) industry - a chemical used in manufacturing plastics, such as those in water bottles and polyesters. The industry has been promoted in Maoming for its economic benefits due to the jobs provided by the factories. Despite the industry's economic benefits, citizens organized PX protest in 2014 as there was increasing concern for the chemical's environmental and health risks to the citizens of the city. To counteract the environmentalist social movement, the government took action by creating an agreement that all civilians must sign stating they will not engage in protests or speak of the industry negatively, which high school students had to sign in order to graduate, as well as implementing an education campaign by providing lectures to the citizens on PX project.

=== France ===
In June 2023, Minister of the Interior Gérald Darmanin announced that the French government would be forcibly dissolving the Les Soulèvements de la Terre. The announcement came following a series of raids by anti-terrorist police against the group, resulting in 18 arrests.

Human Rights Watch stated that the dissolution was "wholly disproportionate" and was part of "a growing trend of stigmatization and criminalization of individuals and civil society organizations raising awareness about the consequences of climate change" in France under Emmanuel Macron.

== See also ==
- Climate change denial – Denial of the scientific consensus on climate change
- Criticism of environmentalism
- Environmental skepticism – Skepticism of environmentalism
- Fossil fuels lobby – Lobbying supporting the fossil fuels industry
- Rolling coal – Modified diesel engines emitting sooty exhaust fumes
- Wise use movement – American political coalition of right-libertarian and anti-statist environmentalists
- Radical environmentalism
