= Adam Eli =

American activist and writer

- Born: Adam Eli Werner; September 26, 1990 (age 36); Westchester County, New York, United States
- Education: University of Southern California
- Occupations: LGBTQ rights activist, author
- Notable work: The New Queer Conscience (2020)

Adam Eli (born September 26, 1990) is an American LGBTQ activist and writer. His first book, The New Queer Conscience, was released in June 2020.

== Career ==
Eli is the founder of Voices4, a nonviolent direct action activist group committed to advancing global queer liberation. It was originally launched to protest the anti-gay purges in Chechnya and has since created international chapters in London and Berlin. He got his start in activism as a member of Gays Against Guns, ultimately managing their social media accounts. Eli has a large following on Instagram and says social media is an important tool in his activism.

Out magazine described Eli as "one of the most prominent young faces in a wave of contemporary activism not seen since ACT UP." He is known for his "signature pink yarmulke." Before beginning in activism, Eli worked in real estate.

In 2019, a video Eli posted went viral showing him being followed and harassed on the street in New York City. “Stay in the closet [...] this is not Judaism!" the unidentified man can be seen yelling. The video has been viewed over a million times and was shared by Mayor Bill De Blasio, who wrote: "There's no place for hate in this city." Eli said he felt compelled to share the video of the confrontation as a reminder that the struggle for LGBTQ rights isn't over.

Eli serves as the editor-in-chief of Gucci's queer zine, Chime Zine. Chime for Change is a global campaign founded by Gucci in 2013 to convene, unite and strengthen voices speaking out for gender equality.

In June 2020, he published his first book, The New Queer Conscience, a part of Penguin Teen's Pocket Change Collective series, which had also published books by Alok Vaid-Menon, Kimberly Drew, and Xiuhtezcatl Martinez.

== Recognition ==
In 2018, Eli was recognized in Out magazine's annual Out100 list, Logo TV's Logo30 list, and Out magazine's "100 Most Eligible Bachelors" list.

== Personal life ==
Eli came out as queer in 2009. He credits his Judaism as "the impetus for [his] queer activism." Eli applies the Jewish principle "Kol Yisreal arevim zeh bazeh," meaning "All Jews are responsible for each other," to his ideology towards his LGBTQ activism, believing that, "queer people anywhere are responsible for queer people everywhere."
