= Jennie Miller Faggen =

American Jewish philanthropist (1874–1968)

- Born: Pesha (Jennie) Cohen; 1874; New York City, U.S.
- Died: September 5, 1968 (aged 93–94); Atlantic City, New Jersey, U.S.

Jennie Miller Faggen (1874 – September 5, 1968) was an American philanthropist. She is noted for her financial support of Orthodox Jewish institutions in the United States, Europe, and Mandatory Palestine during the early 20th century, including the Ponevezh, Mir, and Telshe yeshivas.

== Early life ==
Jennie Cohen was born in 1874 in New York City to Israel and Hannah (Annie) Cohen, Jewish immigrants from the Posen region of Germany. A descendant of Rabbi Akiva Eiger, she was raised in a traditional Jewish home where she acquired a commitment to religious observance and community service. Her father, Israel Cohen, worked as an expressman but died suddenly in 1893, leaving behind a widow and two children.

Despite the challenges of growing up in America at a time when assimilation pressures were strong, she remained committed to her Jewish values.

== Personal life and philanthropy ==
In 1895, Cohen married Harry Miller, a Lithuanian Jewish immigrant who had settled in Philadelphia. Miller saw success in business after he partnered up with a fellow Lithuanian immigrant, Abraham Pleet, establishing Miller & Pleet, a textile firm, and later acquiring Yorkshire Worsted Mills. His financial success allowed the couple to become active patrons of Jewish causes, particularly those related to Jewish education.

The couple resided in Philadelphia's Strawberry Mansion neighborhood in a large home directly across from Fairmount Park.

Following Harry Miller's death in 1923, she continued their philanthropic efforts, becoming a significant benefactor of Orthodox yeshivas in both America and Europe. Her generosity extended to Jewish orphanages, day schools, synagogues, and community centers, ensuring the survival and growth of Torah institutions during a critical period.

In January 1929, Jennie married Nathan Faggen, a 56-year-old widower and influential Philadelphia businessman. Originally from Chernigov (present-day Ukraine), Faggen immigrated to the United States in 1888 at the age of 15. He initially entered the garment industry through a shirt-manufacturing business he operated alongside his first wife's family, the Tutelman family. Over time, he established his own company, Lomar Manufacturing Company, which specialized in the production of men's sleepwear. Beyond his business ventures, Nathan Faggen was involved in Jewish communal work which he shared with Jennie. He served as the president of Congregation Bnei Jeshurun, as well as the president of the local Vaad Hakashrus and Yeshiva Ohel Moshe.

=== Adoption of Cecilia ===
Cecelia Cohen, the daughter of Jennie's brother Samuel, was adopted by Jennie as an infant, as Samuel had several other children and Jennie had none. In an accident that occurred in November 1929, 11-year-old Cecelia suffered severe burns from a candle, leading to her untimely death. This loss profoundly affected Jennie, who channeled her grief into further philanthropic endeavors. In Cecelia's memory, prominent rabbis, including Rabbi Meir Shapiro, Rabbi Boruch Ber Leibowitz, and Rabbi Leizer Yudel Finkel, dedicated days of learning and recited Kaddish annually, honoring the young girl's memory through Torah study.

== Torah philanthropy ==
Jennie Miller Faggen's philanthropic efforts were particularly crucial for yeshivas in Eastern Europe and Mandatory Palestine, many of which relied on American donors for survival. Her financial contributions supported institutions such as the Ponevezh Yeshiva, Mir Yeshiva, Yeshivas Chachmei Lublin, Lomza Yeshiva, and Telshe Yeshiva.

In 1929, she pledged US$8,000 (approximately US$700,000 in today's value) to construct a new building for the Ponevezh Yeshiva in Lithuania, which was completed and opened in a grand ceremony in 1932. The agreement, signed by the Ponevezher Rav, Rabbi Yosef Shlomo Kahaneman, specified that if the yeshiva ever relocated, the building would retain Jennie's name. Though the original yeshiva was destroyed in the Holocaust, the agreement was later honored in Bnei Brak, Israel, with a commemorative plaque recognizing her generosity.

Miller's impact extended beyond Lithuania. The Telshe Yeshiva named its advanced kollel (postgraduate study program) after her, a rare honor for an American woman at the time. Similarly, the Mir Yeshiva had a dedicated kollel named in her honor, known as the "Kollel of Ten Rabbis in the name of Mrs. Pesha Miller".

She also played a key role in supporting Jewish education in America. In 1926, she donated US$100,000 to build a Talmud Torah in Philadelphia, which became one of the city's largest Jewish educational institutions. She was an early benefactor of the Universal Yeshiva in Jerusalem, later known as Merkaz HaRav, under the guidance of Chief Rabbi Avraham Yitzchak HaKohen Kook.

In addition to her support for educational institutions, Jennie was involved in various philanthropic activities. In 1929, she donated US$5,000 at a banquet honoring Rabbi Joseph Isaac Schneerson, the 5th Lubavitcher Rebbe, to support his religious and cultural work in Soviet Russia. This contribution was part of a larger effort that raised US$10,000 during the event.

In addition to all of the yeshivos, she supported the scholarly endeavors of Rabbi Menachem Mendel Kasher, one of the most ambitious Torah scholars of the 20th century. She provided financial backing for his groundbreaking Torah Sheleimah project, an encyclopedic work that aimed to compile all rabbinic sources related to each verse of the Torah, including Talmudic, Midrashic, and Kabbalistic commentaries. Recognizing the scope of this project, she funded a kollel of ten scholars dedicated exclusively to assisting Rabbi Kasher in his research. Her donation enabled the publication of numerous volumes, ensuring that this monumental work could be completed.

== Community and synagogue contributions ==
Beyond yeshivos, Jennie Miller Faggen was involved in supporting Jewish community centers and synagogues. In 1923, she donated US$50,000 to construct a community center in conjunction with the new synagogue of Congregation B'nai Jeshurun in Philadelphia. The center was dedicated to providing Jewish children with religious education, and Jennie made the donation in memory of her late husband, Harry Miller.

Her financial support also extended to the broader Jewish communal infrastructure in Philadelphia, including funding orphanages and day schools to strengthen Jewish education and identity.

Her involvement in Jewish education included organizational work as well as donations. In 1928, Miller chaired the Extension Activities Committee of Philadelphia's Associated Talmud Torahs, which organized a July 4 reception for 1,000 prize-winning children from New York religious schools, including a program at Independence Square and Independence Hall.

In June 1930, she endowed a Talmud Torah room at the National Home for Jewish Children at Denver. During the Great Depression, she served as treasurer of a 1932 joint campaign for Yeshiva Mishkan Israel, Central Talmud Torah, and the Strawberry Mansion Yeshiva and Talmud Torah. The institutions, which educated 600 boys and girls, faced possible closure, and salary arrears to teachers exceeded 20 weeks.

In 1953, Congregation B'nai Jeshurun held a testimonial dinner marking 36 years of her continuous service. The Jewish Exponent reported that she had contributed nearly US$200,000 to the congregation since 1923.

As Miller Faggen grew older and was no longer able to maintain her home in Strawberry Mansion, she moved to an apartment on the Jersey shore. Before relocating, she sent a mishloach manos package to the Kamenetsky family, along with an item from her home known as the "Chair of Gedolim", a chair that had been used by Torah leaders during their visits. Among those who had sat in the chair were Rabbis Meir Shapiro, Avraham Duber Kahana Shapiro, Elchanan Wasserman, Boruch Ber Leibowitz, Shimon Shkop, and Yosef Yitzchak Schneerson. The chair still remains in the Kamenetsky home.

== Legacy and recognition ==
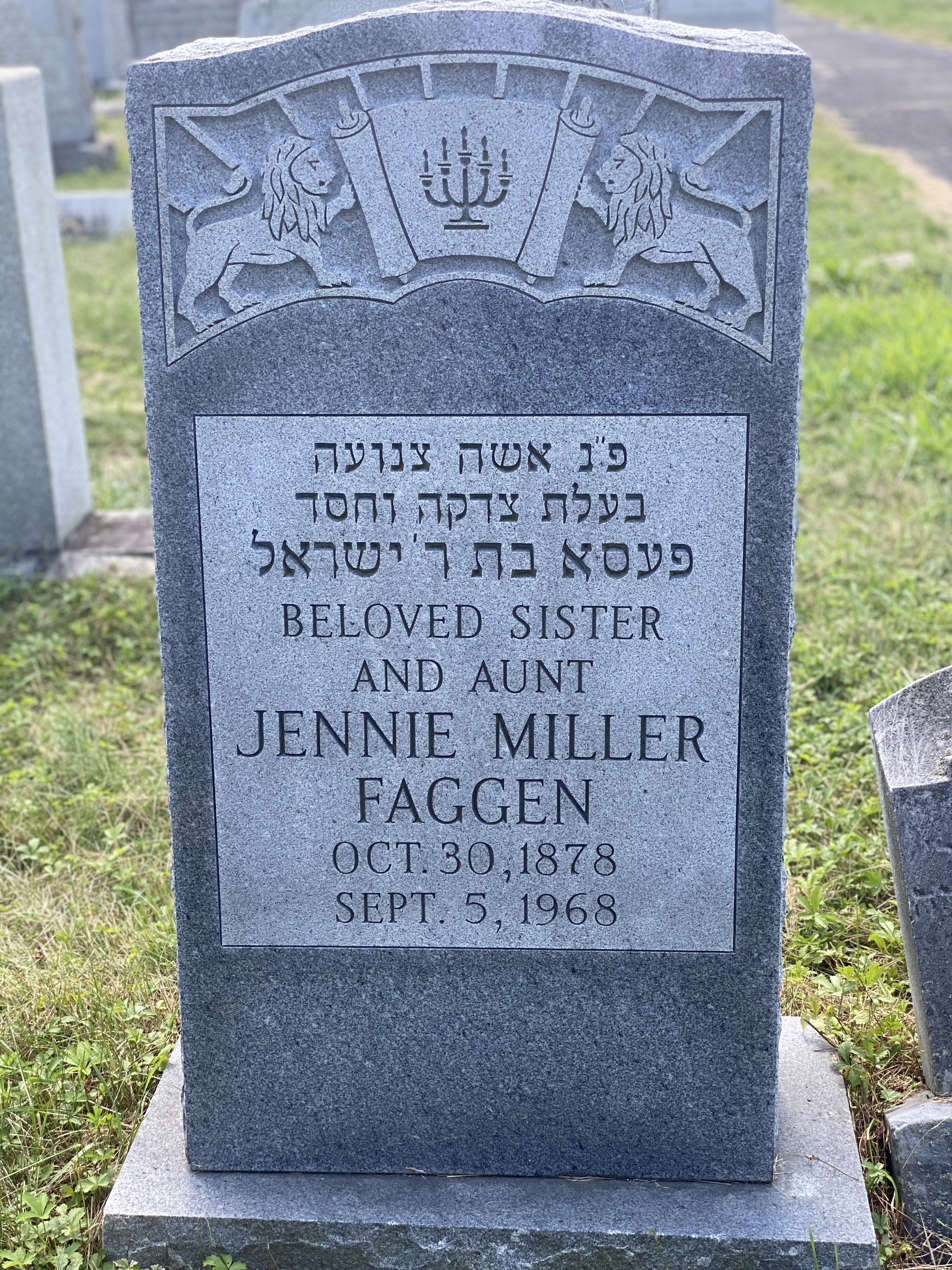
Jennie's Tombstone at Har Nebo Cemetery

Miller Faggen's legacy faded after her death in 1968. In 2023, historian and businessman Dovi Safier published a long form article highlighting her life and philanthropic work, leading to renewed interest in her legacy. She has since attained a rarified status in the Orthodox Jewish community, with her grave at Har Nebo Cemetery in Philadelphia becoming the site of an annual pilgrimage, an honor rarely afforded to Orthodox women.

Rabbi Shmuel Kamenetsky, rosh yeshivah of the Talmudical Yeshiva of Philadelphia and his wife Tema became acquainted with Mrs. Miller Faggen during her final years.

Reflecting on her life, he summed up her legacy succinctly:

"She was a great tzadeikes, there's no sh'eilah (question) about that. People can learn from her to be erliche froyen (upright women), erliche mentschen (upright people), but her true legacy is that she gave everything away. Her life was the yeshivos that she helped. She lived on the tzedakah that she gave."

In April 2023, Mishpacha magazine garnered significant attention and praise for its decision to publish a photograph of Jennie Miller Faggen in an article detailing her contributions to Jewish education. This was notable because Haredi publications traditionally refrain from printing images of women due to religious considerations of modesty. The move was widely regarded as an acknowledgment of Faggen's exceptional impact on Torah institutions, with many praising Mishpacha for recognizing the role of women in Jewish history.

Supporters of the decision viewed it as a milestone in acknowledging the historical contributions of Jewish women, emphasizing that figures like Faggen, who played a pivotal role in sustaining European yeshivos, deserved to be publicly honored. The article sparked discussions within the Haredi community about the balance between longstanding editorial policies and the need to properly document and celebrate the achievements of women in Jewish history. Many saw Mishpacha's decision as a step toward a more inclusive approach while still maintaining the publication's commitment to its readership's values.
