= Zipporah Michelbacher Cohen =

American civic leader in Richmond, Virginia

- Born: Zipporah Michelbacher; December 13, 1853; Richmond, Virginia
- Died: August 20, 1944 (aged 90); Richmond, Virginia
- Occupation: civic leader

Zipporah Michelbacher Cohen (1853 – 1944) was an American civic leader and president of the Ladies Hebrew Benevolent Association in Richmond, Virginia for 34 years.

== Biography ==
Cohen née Michelbacher was born on December 13, 1853, in Richmond, Virginia. She was the daughter of Miriam Angle Michelbacher and Congregation Beth Ahabah's first religious leader, Rabbi Maximilian Joseph Michelbacher. In 1875 she married Samuel Cohen, son of Levi Cohen, the founder of the Cohen Company, one of Richmond's largest department stores. The couple had three children.

Cohen's civic duties began in childhood when her parents opened their home as an informal hospital caring for wounded Confederate soldiers. In 1880, Cohen took up her first formal position as treasurer of the Richmond Eye, Ear, Nose and Throat Infirmary, a clinic for those unable to otherwise obtain medical care. In 1902 she joined the board of directors of the Instructive Visiting Nurses Association (IVNA), representing Richmond's Jewish community on the board. She served on the IVNA board for forty-two years until her death.

In 1904 Cohen was elected president of the Ladies Hebrew Benevolent Association (still in operation today as Jewish Family Services of Richmond). The LHBA provided assistance throughout Richmond, often shifting focus to meet the demands of the evolving city. During Cohen's presidency, the association began to expand its efforts beyond material relief to offer advice to its clients on ways to improve their situations, and in 1937 the LHBA hired its first professional social worker. She remained president until 1938, serving through the World War I era as well as the Great Depression. In 1918, she tried in vain to recruit her replacement, writing: "It was my earnest desire that one of you would become my successor, but my desire did not become a reality." Cohen remains the longest-serving president of Jewish Family Services of Richmond.

Cohen died on August 20, 1944.
