= Environmental skepticism =

Skepticism of environmentalism

Environmental skepticism is the belief that statements by environmentalists, and the environmental scientists who support them, are false or exaggerated. The term is also applied to those who are critical of environmentalism in general. It can additionally be defined as doubt about the authenticity or severity of environmental degradation. Environmental skepticism is closely linked with anti-environmentalism and climate change denial. Environmental skepticism can also be the result of cultural and lived experiences.

== About ==
Environmental skeptics have argued that the extent of harm coming from human activities is less certain than scientists and scientific bodies say, or that it is too soon to be introducing curbs in these activities on the basis of existing evidence, or that further discussion is needed regarding who should pay for such environmental initiatives. One of the themes the movement focuses on is the idea that environmentalism is a growing threat to social and economic progress and the civil liberties.

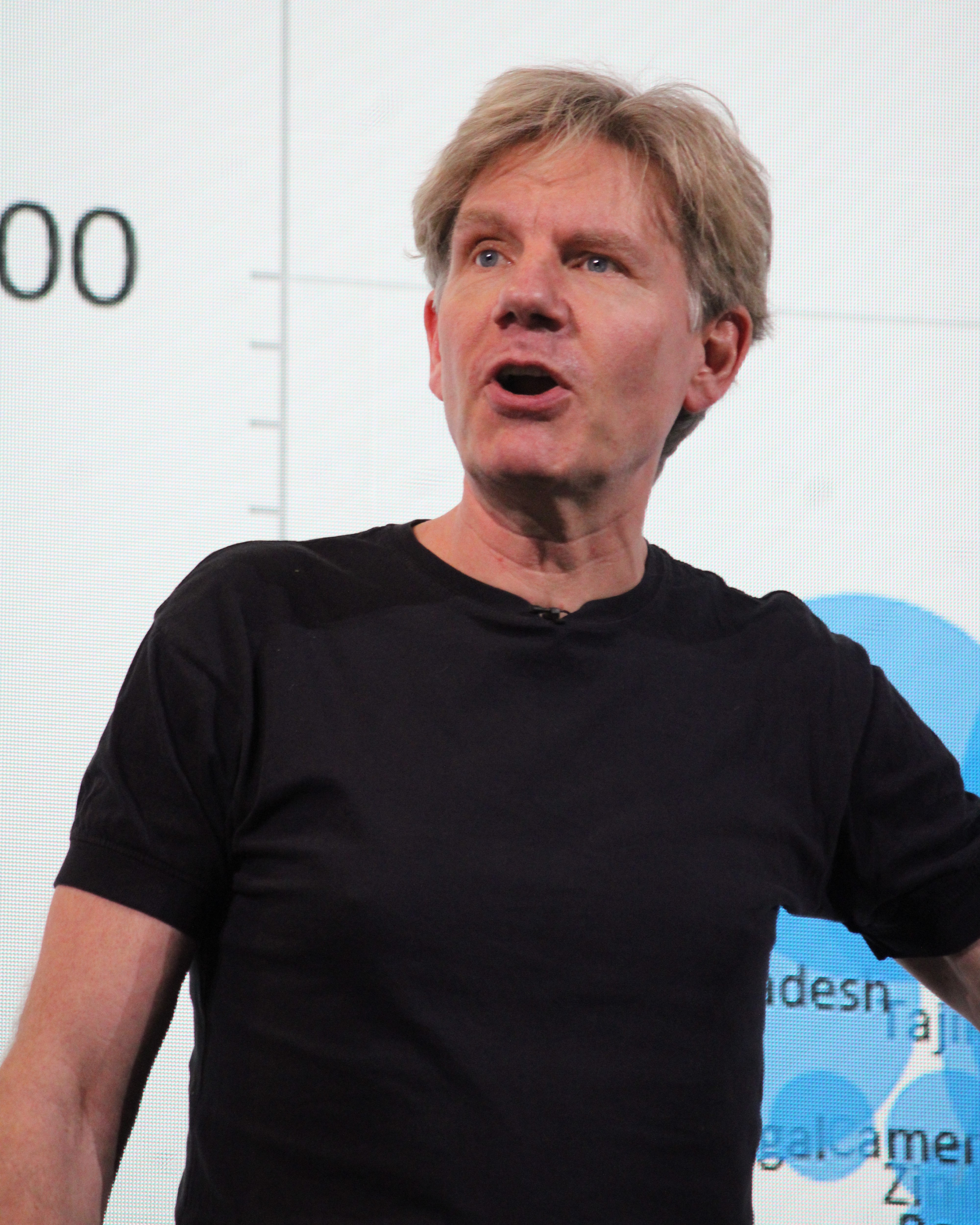
Bjørn Lomborg in 2025

The popularity of the term was enhanced by Bjørn Lomborg's 2001 book The Skeptical Environmentalist. Lomborg approached environmental claims from a statistical and economic standpoint, and concluded that often the claims made by environmentalists were overstated. Lomborg argued, on the basis of cost–benefit analysis, that few environmentalist claims warranted serious concern. The book came under criticism by scientists noting that Lomborg misinterpreted or misrepresented data, criticized misuse of data while committing similar mistakes himself, examined issues supporting his thesis while ignoring information contrary to it, cherry picks literature, oversimplifies, fails to discuss uncertainty or subjectivity, cites mostly media sources, and largely ignores ecology.

Michael Shermer, who debated Lomborg on several topics from his book, notes that despite the scientific consensus many people are driven to environmental skepticism by the extremism inherent in both sides of the debate and not having been exposed to a sufficiently succinct and visual presentation of the available evidence.

In 2010, Lomborg refined his position and stated that he believes in the need for "tens of billions of dollars a year to be invested in tackling climate change" and declared global warming to be "undoubtedly one of the chief concerns facing the world today" and "a challenge humanity must confront". He summarized his position, saying "Global warming is real - it is man-made and it is an important problem. But it is not the end of the world."

A 2014 study of individuals from 32 countries found that environmental skepticism stems from insufficient education, self-assessed knowledge, religious/conservative values, lack of trust in society, mistrust of science, and other concerns trumping environmental concern.

=== Climate change skepticism ===
According to an annual poll conducted by the Pew Research Center, global warming has been a low public priority, ranking 29 out of 30 in the top priorities for the United States President and Congress. Additionally, in a list of 20 policy priorities, it ranks 19th.

Climate skeptics represent about a third of Americans according to national polls. This number makes it challenging for decision-makers who hesitate to implement environmental policies related to global warming and climate change. Anthony Leiserowitz, a professor from Yale, determined that the American community's attitude towards climate change fall on a scale from concerned or alarmed to disengaged or dismissive. The term climate skeptic is made up of numerous components such as dubious, doubtful, dismissive, and denial. It does not describe simply a non-believer. In a survey conducted by the Pew Research Center, 61% of the public believed there was evidence of global warming. However, 35% of the public still believed there was no significant evidence for global temperature rise.

Climate skepticism is considered to be strictly an American belief constructed of governmental fear, scientific distrust, and interests in resource extraction that support a dominant Western lifestyle. Academics argue that we need to understand Americans underlying ideologies before we denote someone as a skeptic.

A cultural study on Maryland's Eastern Shore helped discern some of the differing beliefs of Americans about environmental change. The study included three groups of residents who are dependent on the Eastern Shore of Maryland: commercial fishermen, farmers, and recent migrants. The research conducted was determined to gain a consensus of shared knowledge between the subgroups in regard to the changing environment. Along the scale from denial to concerned, it was found that a majority of respondents noticed climate change but believed that humans were not the cause of it. About a third of the respondents were unaware of it, while the rest of the interlocutors were either dismissive of it or somewhat concerned.

One of the cultural models found in this research was that climate change was natural. The respondents interpreted the changes such as rising sea-levels and drought as cycles of nature. They explained them as natural processes in the Earth's evolution not affected by humans. They expressed doubt about human induced climate change but acknowledged the changing environment around them. The residents of the Eastern Shore question the legitimacy of the buildup of greenhouse gases from our use of fossil fuels, which cause sea level rise or glacial melting. Part of this hesitation comes from the knowledge passed down through their families and the stories of weather cycles from previous relatives, all who lived in the same area for generations. This concept of nature going through cycles is culturally significant to the groups living in the area.

The respondents also make note that climate change may have been newly identified by scientists but has been a phenomenon that has been with us from the beginning of time and not with the onset of the industrial revolution. This reinforces the belief that climate change is happening, just not because of humans. Therefore, when contemporary theories of climate change challenge respondents’ longstanding traditional cultural models, the latter tends to emerge as the more likely outcome.

The respondents also believe that if climate change becomes apparent to politicians as a human-induced problem, that will lead to regulations being placed on them. They do not believe that climate policies will benefit them and are therefore unlikely to support such programs. They are concerned more with policies and regulations rather than climate change in the area. They see themselves as living with the climate instead of the common approach of overcoming or conquering it. Living with the climate is viewed as nature and society being connected and sharing a relationship where humans must change their activities to fit the changing climate.

Communicating with people who are labeled as skeptics can help create policies that may not be rejected. These beliefs are deeply rooted in longstanding traditions and not influenced by right wing think tanks or other media platforms. Therefore, communicating and working with these people may help reduce the amount of time it will take for policies to be accepted and approved by them. For policy makers to be effective, they should consider the knowledge that these people have and work with them instead of imposing a top-down approach for climate change policy.

== Criticism ==
According to The Guardian, such widespread skeptical doubts have not developed independently, but have been "encouraged by lobbying and PR campaigns financed by the polluting industries". Supporters of environmentalists argue that "skepticism" implies a form of denialism, and that, in the US particularly, "large donations [have been made] to Senators and Congressmen and [have] sponsored neoliberal think tanks and contrarian scientific research. ExxonMobil, the oil major, has been accused by Friends of the Earth and others of giving millions of dollars to a long list of think-tanks and lobbyists opposed to Kyoto."

A study from 2008 showed that the overwhelming majority of environmentally skeptical books published since the 1970s were either written or published by authors or institutions affiliated with right-wing think tanks. It concludes that "scepticism is a tactic of an elite-driven counter-movement designed to combat environmentalism, and that the successful use of this tactic has contributed to the weakening of US commitment to environmental protection."

Peter Jacques wrote, "The skeptical environmental counter-movement is a civic problem and in dealing with the propositions from the counter-movement we are forced to reach down to the bedrock issues of epistemology, identities, articulation and other core work for politics. To use scientism as a hammer against the screw of skepticism will split the wood of public life into splinters or it will immobilize the hammer. Scientism is a modernist tool that will haplessly reshuffle the old excursions - and we all know the 'master's tools will not dismantle the master's house".

== See also ==
- Antiscience
- Anti-environmentalism
- Climate change denial
- Global warming controversy
- Media coverage of climate change
- Renewable energy commercialization#Non-technical barriers to acceptance

== Selected works and analyses ==
=== Neutral or environmentally supportive ===
- de Steiguer, Joseph E. (2006). The origins of modern environmental thought. Tucson: University of Arizona Press. ISBN 978-0-8165-2461-7. OCLC 64486430.
- Michaels, David (2008). Doubt is Their Product: How Industry's Assault on Science Threatens Your Health. Oxford University Press. ISBN 978-0-19-530067-3.
- Mooney, Chris (2006). The Republican War on Science. Basic Books. ISBN 978-0-465-04676-8.
- James A. Swan (1995). In defense of hunting. Harpercollins. ISBN 978-0-06-251237-6.
- Shearer, Christine (2011). Kivalina: A Climate Change Story. Haymarket Books. ISBN 978-1-60846-128-8.

=== Environmentally skeptic ===
- Christopher C. Horner (12 February 2007). The Politically Incorrect Guide to Global Warming and Environmentalism. Simon and Schuster. ISBN 978-1-59698-044-0.
- Bethell, Tom (2005). The Politically Incorrect Guide to Science. Regnery Pub. ISBN 978-0-89526-031-4.
- Huber, Peter (1999). Hard Green: Saving the Environment from the Environmentalists : a Conservative Manifesto. Basic Books. ISBN 978-0-465-03113-9.
- Lomborg, Bjørn (2001). The Skeptical Environmentalist: Measuring the Real State of the World. ISBN 978-0-521-01068-9.
- Alston Chase (1995). In a Dark Wood: The Fight Over Forests and the Myths of Nature. Transaction Pub. ISBN 978-0-7658-0752-6.
- Driessen, Paul (2003). Eco-Imperialism: Green Power, Black Death. Free Enterprise Press. ISBN 978-0-939571-23-9.
- Patrick J. Michaels; Robert C. Balling (2000). The satanic gases: clearing the air about global warming. Cato Institute. ISBN 978-1-882577-92-7.
- Reisman, George, The Toxicity of Environmentalism, Laguna Hills, CA, The Jefferson School of Philosophy, Economics & Psychology, 1990 ISBN 1-931089-01-9
- José Ortega y Gasset; Datus Proper (1995). Meditations on Hunting. ISBN 978-1-885106-18-6.
