= Sally Gottesman =

Sally Gottesman is the founder and president of The Eleemosynary Group, consultants to non-profit organizations based in New York City.

== Career ==
Gottesman is the Chair of Encounter and was the cofounder of Moving Traditions and served as Founding Chair of the Board. Gottesman served on the Board of Directors of American Jewish World Service, Bikkurim, Jewish Women's Archive, Jewish Meditation Center of Brooklyn, American Friends of Yedid, and Storah Telling. Gottesman received her B.A. from Wellesley College and her master's degree in Public and Private Management from Yale University. She was formerly a consultant for KPMG and New York Regional Director of the New Israel Fund.

Through her work with Moving Traditions, she started the Bat Mitzvah Firsts project, which conducted surveys over the Internet to collect stories of women's experiences. With the results of the survey, Moving Traditions and The National Museum of American Jewish History have collaborated to organize a traveling exhibition, Bat Mitzvah Comes of Age, featuring the story of how, in less than a century, individual girls, their parents and their rabbis challenged communal values to institute this now widely practiced Jewish ritual of the Bat Mitzvah. Gottesman writes regularly about philanthropy and progressive Jewish issues.

== Publications ==
Articles and works include:

- Young Women Changing the World (2002), The Journal of the Steinhardt Foundation for Jewish Life
- On the Board: Influencing Rabbinic Training from a Distance (2003), Jewish Family & Life (JFL Media)
- Male/Female Marketing: The Challenges to the Jewish Community (2004), The Journal of the Steinhardt Foundation for Jewish Life
- Mega does not Equal Male (2006), The Journal of the Steinhardt Foundation for Jewish Life
- Bat Mitzvah Firsts, The Jewish Week
- Sally Gottesman's $100 Million Idea, JInsider
- A Conversation with Sally Gottesman, Moving Traditions
