= Repertoire of contention =

Methods of protest

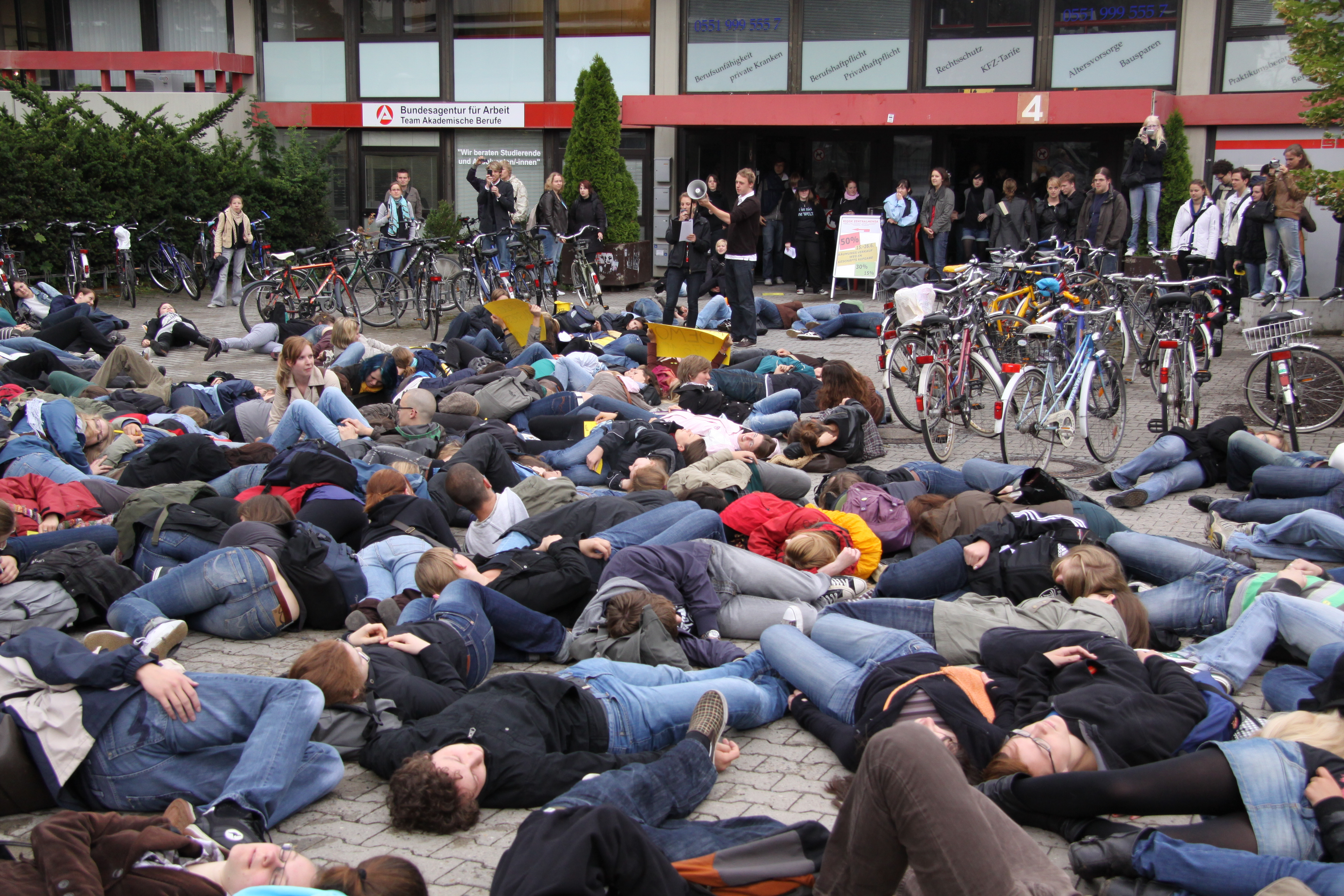
A sit-in is one of many tools in the modern movement's repertoires of contention.

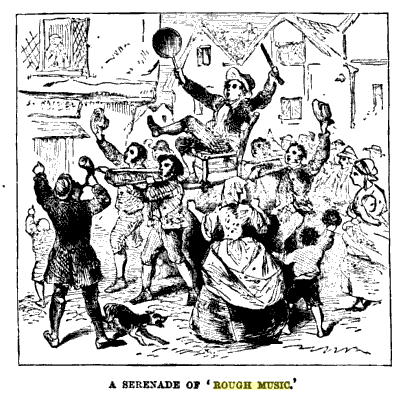
Repertoires can be transitory; consider the disappearance of rough music, popular in the 18th century Great Britain.

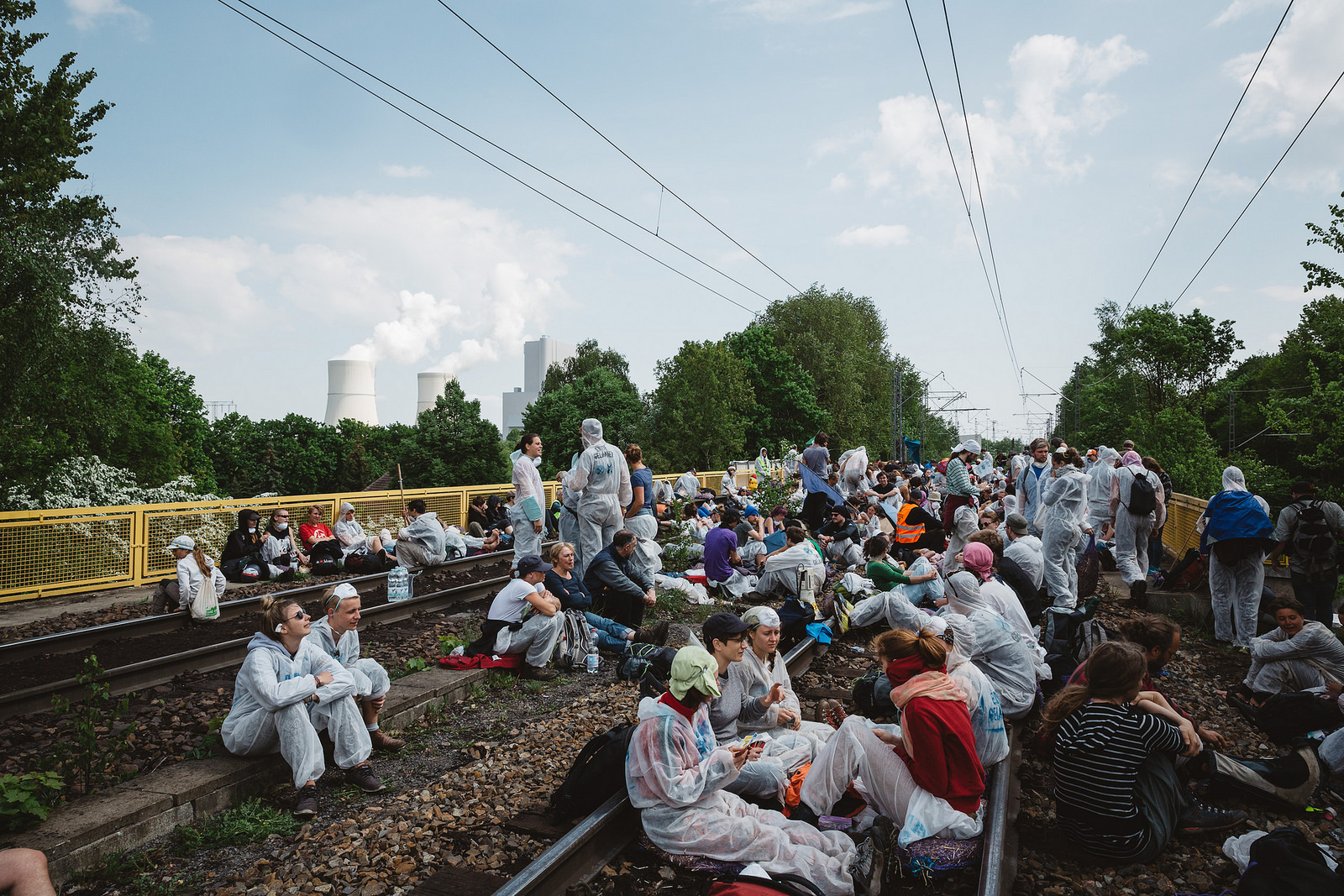
Activists blocking railway lines leading to a coal mine to limit climate change (Ende Gelände 2016)

Repertoire of contention refers, in social movement theory, to the set of various protest-related tools and actions available to a movement or related organization in a given time frame. The historian Charles Tilly, who brought the concept into common usage, also referred to the "repertoire of collective action."

== Description ==
Repertoires are often shared between social actors; as one group (organization, movement, etc.) finds a certain tool or action successful, in time, it is likely to spread to others. However, in addition to providing options, repertoires can be seen as limiting, as people tend to focus on familiar tools and actions, and innovation outside their scope is uncommon (see diffusion of innovations).

Actions and tools that belong to common repertoires of contention include, but are not limited to: creation of special-purpose associations and coalitions, public meetings, solemn processions, vigils, rallies, demonstrations, sit-ins, petition drives, statements to and in public media, boycotts, riots, strikes and pamphleteering. Repertoires change over time, and can vary from place to place. They are determined both by what the actors know how to do, and what is expected from them. Early repertoires, from the time before the rise of the modern social movement, included food riots and banditry. The changing nature of repertoires of contention can be seen in a sample element of the mid-18th century British repertoire of contention, the rough music: a humiliating and loud public punishment inflicted upon one or more people who have violated the standards of the rest of the community. For yet another example, consider that in the recent years, Internet-focused repertoires have been developed (see hacktivism). Recent scholarship has introduced a notion that in addition to the "traditional" and "modern" repertoires, a new, "digital", repertoire may be emerging. In the wake of the COVID-19 pandemic modes of contention at the intersection of physical and digital evolved, described by Yunus Berndt as peopleless protests.

While the term is used most often in the social movement theory context, it can be applied to any political actors. Repertoires of contention also existed before the birth of the modern social movement (a period most scholars identify as the late 18th to early 19th century).

== Historical development ==
Much attention has been given to substantial and lasting changes in the repertoire of collective action over time, though these changes tend to take hold unevenly and in given regions. Tilly notes that, "Some time in the nineteenth century, the people of most western countries shed the collective-action repertoire they had been using for two centuries or so, and adopted the repertoire they still use today." This change seems to correspond to the Industrial Revolution and the rise of labor-based politics. Theorist Joshua Clover has argued that the repertoire in the west undergoes another dramatic shift with deindustrialization, as labor-based politics recede and mass actions shift to public space and its control by the state and police power, away from the production toward the circulation of goods and people, all in all opening onto an era of "circulation struggles." Related arguments suggest the increasing centrality of climate-based struggles within the repertoire.

== See also ==
- Civil disobedience
