= Esther Swirk Brown =

American anti-segregation activist (1917–1970)

Esther Brown
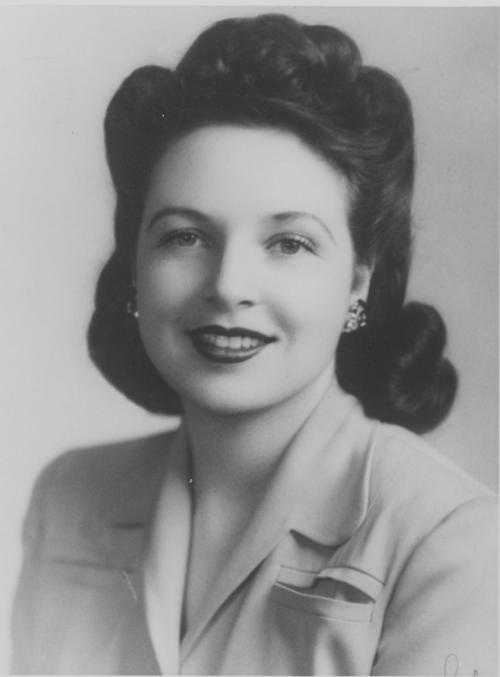
- Brown c. 1943
- Born: Esther Swirk; September 19, 1917; Kansas City, Missouri, US
- Died: May 24, 1970 (aged 52); Buffalo, New York, US
- Known for: Desegregating the schools in South Park, Kansas

Esther Swirk Brown (September 19, 1917 – May 24, 1970) was an American activist who successfully fought to desegregate the schools of South Park, a neighborhood of Merriam, Kansas. She was instrumental in the successful case of Webb v. School District No. 90, which desegregated the schools in South Park. For her role in Brown v. Board of Education, she became known as "the white Mrs. Brown".

== Early life ==
Esther Swirk was born on September 19, 1917, to Russian-Jewish immigrants in Kansas City, Missouri. When she was 10 years old, her mother died of cancer. Her father and her uncle largely raised her after the passing of her mother. Her father was a secular watchmaker who was active in left-wing causes such as the Human Rights Club and the International Workers Order. Inspired both by her father's activism and the ethics of Judaism, she joined a picket line of garment workers. She also attended Commonwealth College, a school known for its communist sympathies. She married Paul Brown in 1943. They had two daughters and moved to Merriam, Kansas.

== Activism ==
Upon moving to Merriam, the Brown family hired a domestic worker named Helen Swann. Swann informed Esther Brown of the poor conditions of the Walker School, a segregated school for Black children in the South Park neighborhood of Merriam.

=== Background ===
South Park historically was an integrated community, founded as such in 1887. Segregation in South Park schools began in 1912 when a new school was built that was only for the benefit of the White children in the town. Segregation was illegal in Merriam, as the town's population was under 15,000, which was the required size by Kansas law to allow for segregated schools; however, the schools were segregated regardless. The conflict over segregated schools boiled over in 1947, when a new school was built exclusively for the benefit of White children, despite all residents paying for the bond, including the Black families living in South Park at the time. The Walker School only had two teachers to teach eight grades, with one of the teachers being uncertified. The school's bathrooms were outdoors and there was standing water in the basement that would be as high as 4 feet (1.2 m).

=== Brown's role ===
Brown was furious at the creation of the new school only for White families, while the Walker School lay in disrepair. Brown suggested that a chapter of the National Association for the Advancement of Colored People (NAACP) be founded in South Park to aid in the activism for better schools for the Black children of South Park. Brown and Alfonso Webb, a community leader, met with Rev. E. A. Freeman, the president of the Kansas City, Kansas, chapter of the NAACP to organize a chapter, where Webb was its first president.

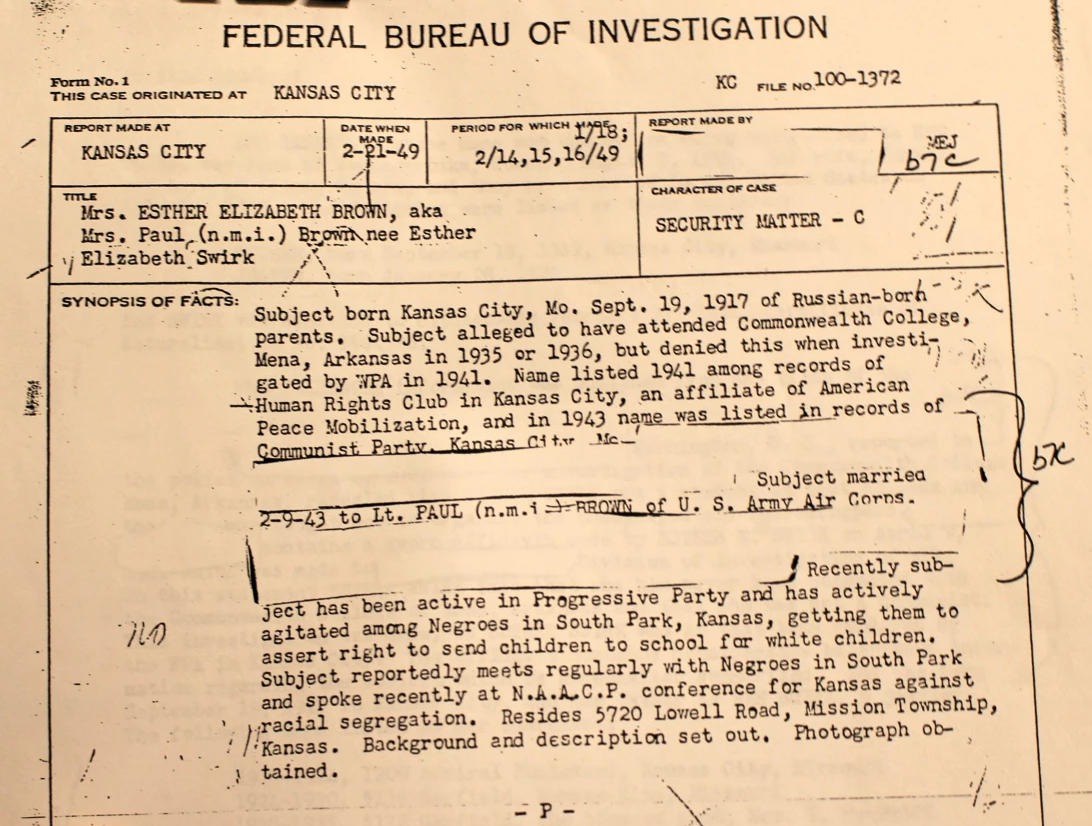
An FBI file on Brown, which charged her with agitating African Americans in South Park

Swann and Brown went to a school board meeting that was attended by the school board plus four White and six Black non-board members. Swann and Brown implored the board to improve the education for Black students in South Park, but the education board voted down their request. The day after the meeting Brown received a phone call from B.A. Larson, the school board's hired architect. Larson advised Brown and her husband, who also attended the school board meeting, to "mind [their] own business" and warned Brown about what happened to a pharmacist in Shawnee who had also supported Black people. The pharmacist had to move out of town after all of the town's people stopped going to the store and refused to sell anything to him. The day after the phone call from Larson, the school board president invited Brown to a "small meeting" to discuss the Walker School. The "small meeting" turned out to be a meeting attended by the school board and 350 White people who were jeering at Brown as she attempted to speak. Brown described the crowd as resembling "a bunch of lynchers from the South." Brown received violent threats after the meeting including a cross being burned on the Browns' front lawn. The town gerrymandered itself into two school districts, one White district and one Black district, to prevent itself from violating the rule barring segregated schools.

As a result of all of this and with the backing of the Kansas City NAACP, the South Park NAACP sued the school board to require the school board to allow Black students in the new school. Displeased with the initial lawyer hired by the South Park NAACP, Brown convinced others to replace the lawyer with Elisha Scott, a civil rights attorney. Brown was also able to convince the national NAACP to intervene in the case; believing it unusual for them to intervene on a case so small, Brown remarked "but I was halfway hysterical all the time and wouldn't leave them alone. I guess they had to". On one occasion, when the Kansas City NAACP sought to divert funds requisitioned for the case by the national organization to other causes, Thurgood Marshall called them and shouted "God damn it, give that white lady the money".

=== Trial ===
The trial began in late September 1948 in a courtroom in Johnson County, Kansas. While the case was pending, Brown's activism caused almost all of the Black families in South Park to boycott the Walker School, instead having the families run schools at their homes. The home schools had issues with financing, so Brown traveled throughout Kansas to raise money for them. Former teacher at the Walker School and then homeschool educator, Corinthian Nutter, fought tirelessly to ensure that the boycott of the Walker School was successful including recruiting parents who enrolled their children back at the Walker School to return their children to the home schools. In June 1949, the Supreme Court of Kansas ruled that Black students were allowed to attend the new White school and the school was integrated in Fall 1949.

== Later life and legacy ==
After the decision to integrate the schools in South Park, Brown continued her activism. She helped raise funds for Brown v. Board of Education and helped to persuade Oliver Brown (no relation) to have his daughter, Linda, be the lead plaintiff. She fought against discrimination in employment in Kansas leading to the Kansas Anti-Discrimination Commission, which later became the Kansas Commission on Civil Rights. In 1957, she was an organizer of the Panel of American Women (PAW) and was the panel's national organizer.

Brown died on May 24, 1970, at age 52, from breast cancer, in Buffalo, New York. In 1975, a park was named in her honor in South Park.
