= Death education =

Instruction on issues relating to death

Death education is education about death that focuses on the human and emotional aspects of death. Though it may include teaching on the biological aspects of death, teaching about coping with grief is a primary focus. The scientific study of death is known as thanatology. Thanatology stems from the Greek word thanatos, meaning death, and ology meaning a science or organized body of knowledge. A specialist in this field is a thanatologist.

== History ==
Historically, death education in American society has been seen as a taboo topic, not worthy of scholarly research or for educational purposes. In the 1960s pioneering professionals like that of Herman Feifel (1959), Elisabeth Kübler-Ross (1969), and Cicely Saunders (1967) encouraged behavioral scientists, clinicians, and humanists to pay attention and to study death-related topics. This initiated the death-awareness movement and began the widespread study of death-related behavior, developing new programs of care for the dying and bereaved, as well as new research on death-related attitudes.

== Goals ==
"Death is no enemy of life; it restores our sense of the value of living. Illness restores the sense of proportion that is lost when we take life for granted. To learn about value and proportion we need to honor illness, and ultimately to honor death." Death education honors death by educating about death, dying, and bereavement to enrich personal lives, inform and guide individuals in their transactions with society, prepare individuals for their public roles as citizens, help prepare and support individuals in their professional and vocational roles, and lastly to enhance the ability of individuals to communicate effectively about death-related matters.

== Curriculum ==
Students of a death education course need to clearly understand the complex knowledge of the subject, learn the five key areas of knowledge, and to learn the physical, psycho-social, behavioral, and cognitive aspects of death. The five key areas are: understanding the dying process, decision making for end of life, loss, grief, and bereavement, assessment and intervention, and traumatic death. Death education should be taught in perspective and one's emotional response should be proportionate to the occasion. In addition death education can be taught formally or informally. Formally planned death education is associated with learning in organized educational settings including: schools, colleges, graduate education, professional workshops, and volunteer training programs.

== Stages of dying ==
In her book, On Death and Dying (1969), Elisabeth Kubler-Ross proposed the five stages of the dying process. Though her work has often been referred to as the "five stages of grief," the original work was based on her interviews with terminally ill patients and her clinical observations of the psychosocial responses of those patients to their impending death.

Much scholarly debate has surrounded the legitimacy of her five "stages" (i.e., denial, anger, bargaining, depression, and acceptance, respectively). Experienced psychosocial clinicians and thanatologists have largely rejected the accuracy of the model because it addresses only emotional states, sets up false expectations of the process, and have not been empirically verified as a descriptive model.

== Hospice ==
One of the major organizations that educates people on death is hospice. Hospice offers support for the caregiver, and Hospice also offers information on what to expect before death and what the family can expect after death. One of the major subjects that hospice addresses within death are the myths that come along with death. Hospice will also walk caretakers through the signs and symptoms to look for that signify death.
