= Activism =

Efforts to make change in society toward a perceived greater good

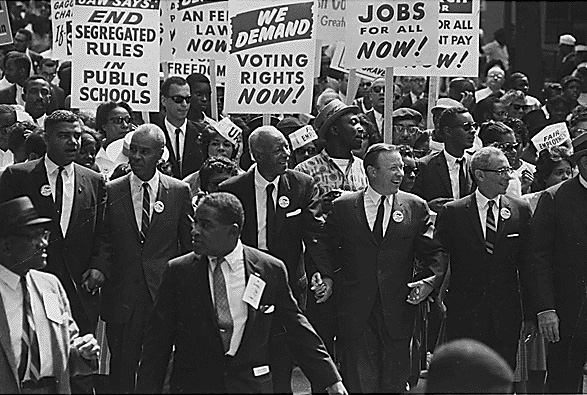
Civil rights activists at the March on Washington for Jobs and Freedom during the civil rights movement in August 1963.

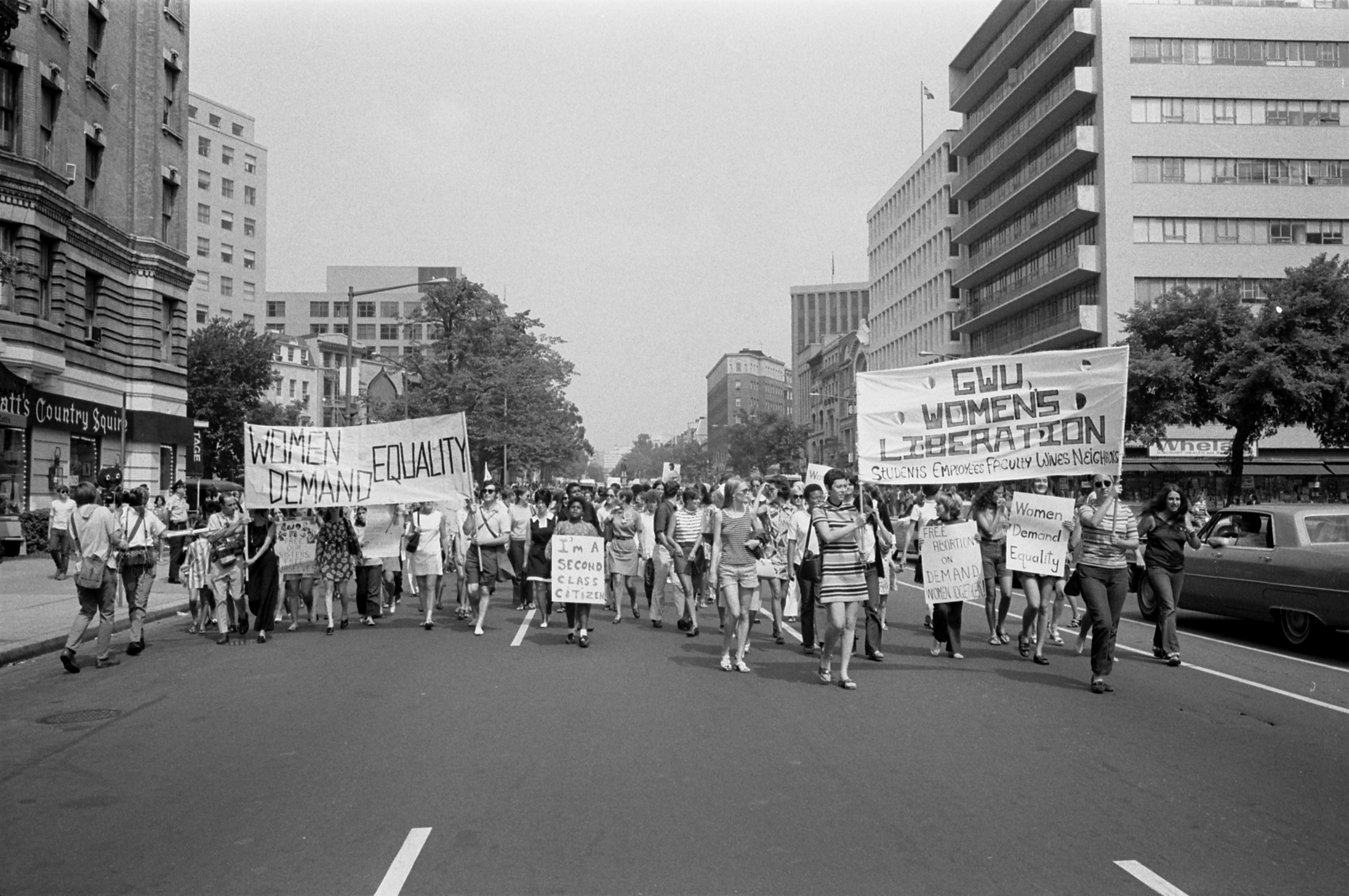
A women's liberation march in Washington, D.C., August 1970.

Activism consists of efforts to promote, impede, direct or intervene in social, political, economic or environmental reform with the desire to make changes in society toward a perceived common good. Forms of activism range from mandate building in a community (including writing letters to newspapers), petitioning elected officials, running or contributing to a political campaign, preferential patronage (or boycott) of businesses, and demonstrative forms of activism like rallies, street marches, strikes, sit-ins, or hunger strikes.

Activism may be performed on a day-to-day basis in a wide variety of ways, including through the creation of art (artivism), computer hacking (hacktivism), or simply in how one chooses to spend their money (economic activism). For example, the refusal to buy clothes or other merchandise from a company as a protest against the exploitation of workers by that company could be considered an expression of activism. However, the term commonly refers to a form of collective action, in which numerous individuals coordinate an act of protest together. Collective action that is purposeful, organized, and sustained over a period of time becomes known as a social movement.

Historically, activists have used literature, including pamphlets, tracts, and books to disseminate or propagate their messages and attempt to persuade their readers of the justice of their cause. Research has now begun to explore how contemporary activist groups use social media to facilitate civic engagement and collective action combining politics with technology. Left-wing and right-wing online activists often use different tactics. Hashtag activism and offline protest are more common on the left. Working strategically with partisan media, migrating to alternative platforms, and manipulation of mainstream media are more common on the right (in the United States). In addition, the perception of increased left-wing activism in science and academia may decrease conservative trust in science and motivate some forms of conservative activism, including on college campuses. Some scholars have also shown how the influence of very wealthy Americans is a form of activism.

Separating activism and terrorism can be difficult and has been described as a 'fine line'.

== Definitions of activism ==
The Online Etymology Dictionary records the English words "activism" and "activist" as in use in the political sense from the year 1920 or 1915 respectively. The history of the word activism traces back to earlier understandings of collective behavior and social action. As late as 1969 activism was defined as "the policy or practice of doing things with decision and energy", without regard to a political signification, whereas social action was defined as "organized action taken by a group to improve social conditions", without regard to normative status. Following the surge of "new social movements" in the United States during the 1960s, activism came to be understood as a rational and legitimate democratic form of protest or appeal.

However, the history of the existence of revolt through organized or unified protest in recorded history dates back to the slave revolts of the 1st century BC(E) in the Roman Empire, where under the leadership of former gladiator Spartacus 6,000 slaves rebelled and were crucified from Capua to Rome in what became known as the Third Servile War.

In English history, the Peasants' Revolt erupted in response to the imposition of a poll tax, and has been paralleled by other rebellions and revolutions in Hungary, Russia, and more recently, for example, Hong Kong. In 1930 under the leadership of Mahatma Gandhi thousands of protesting Indians participated in the Salt March, as a protest against the oppressive taxes of their government, resulting in the imprisonment of 60,000 people and eventually independence of their nation. In nations throughout Asia, Africa and South America, the prominence of activism organized by social movements and especially under the leadership of civil activists or social revolutionaries has pushed for increasing national self-reliance or, in some parts of the developing world, collectivist communist or socialist organization and affiliation. Activism has had major impacts on Western societies as well, particularly over the past century through social movements such as the Labour movement, the women's rights movement, and the civil rights movement.

== Types of activism ==
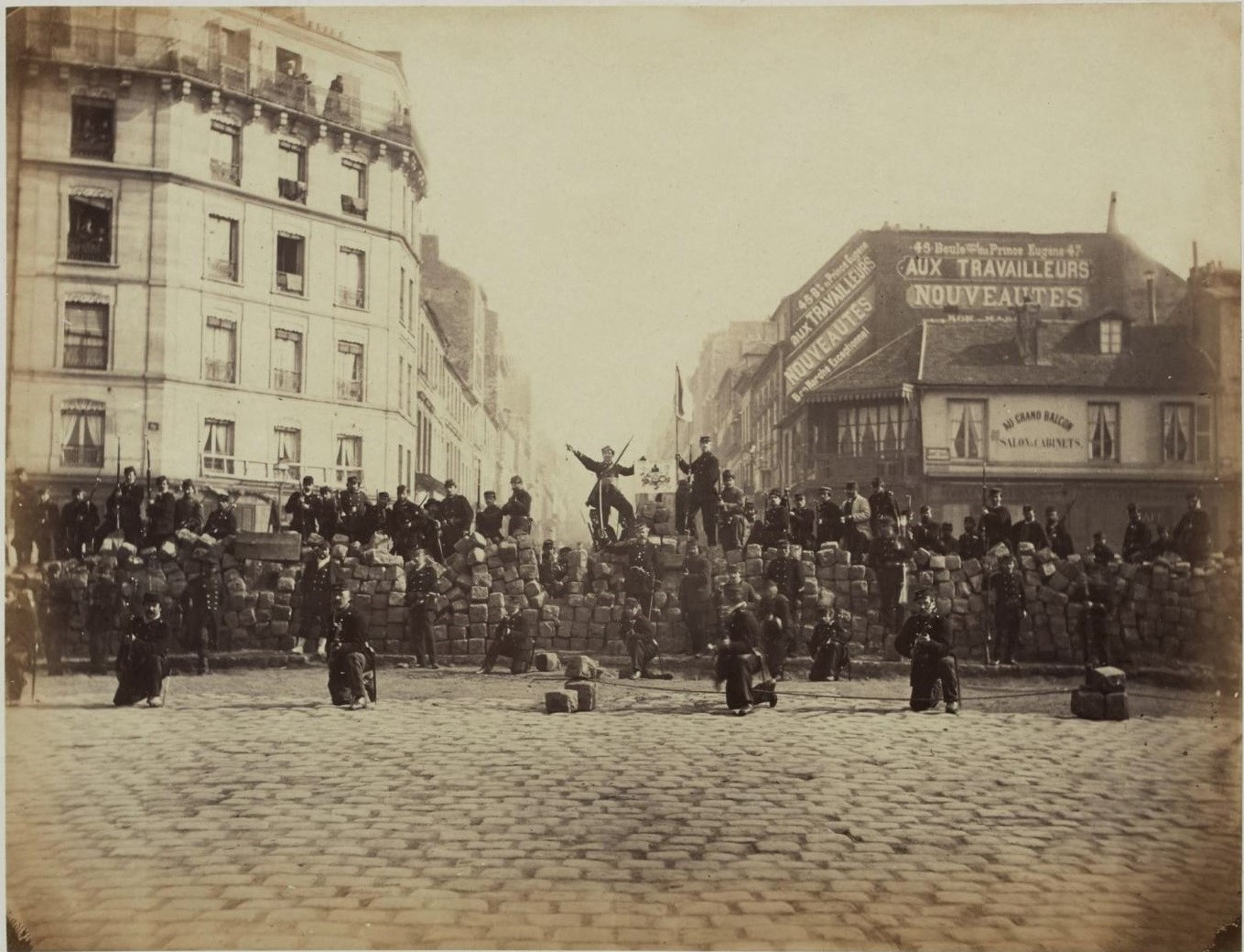
Barricade at the Paris Commune, March 1871.

Activism has often been thought to address either human rights or environmental concerns, but libertarian and religious right activism are also important types. Human rights and environmental issues have historically been treated separately both within international law and as activist movements; prior to the 21st century, most human rights movements did not explicitly treat environmental issues, and likewise, human rights concerns were not typically integrated into early environmental activism. In the 21st century, the intersection between human rights and environmentalism has become increasingly important, leading to criticism of the mainstream environmentalist movement and the development of the environmental justice and climate justice movements.

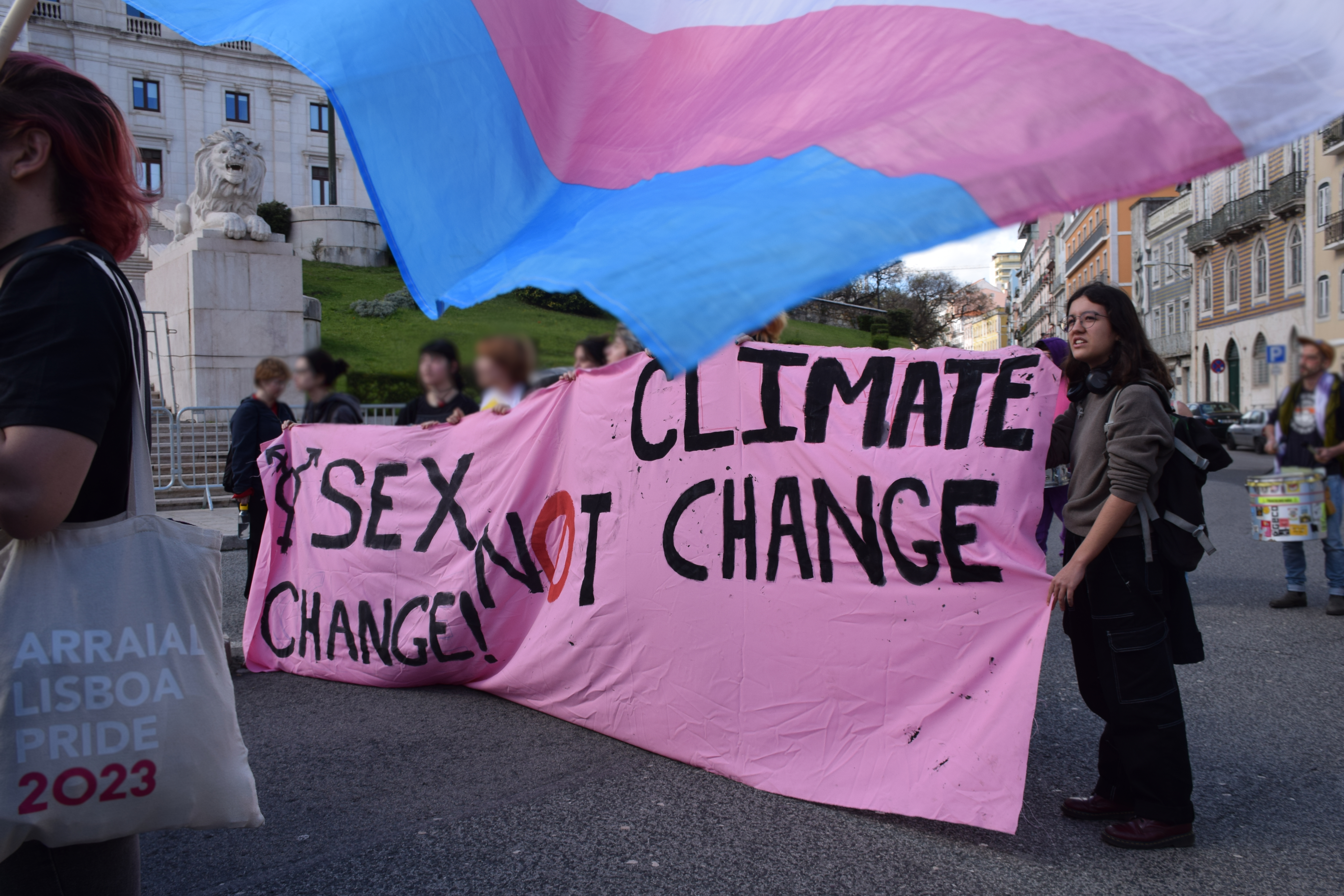
Lisbon, 31 March 2024: As part of the demonstration for the day of transgender visibility, climate activists hold a banner saying "Sex Change not Climate Change"

=== Human rights ===
Human rights activism seeks to protect basic rights such as those laid out in the Universal Declaration of Human Rights including such liberties as: right to life, citizenship, and property, freedom of movement; constitutional freedoms of thought, expression, religion, peaceful assembly; and others. The foundations of the global human rights movement involve resistance to colonialism, imperialism, slavery, racism, segregation, patriarchy, and oppression of indigenous peoples.

=== Environment ===
Environmental activism takes quite a few forms:

- the protection of nature or the natural environment driven by a utilitarian conservation ethic or a nature oriented preservationist ethic
- the protection of the human environment (by pollution prevention or the protection of cultural heritage or quality of life)
- the conservation of depletable natural resources
- the protection of the function of critical earth system elements or processes such as the climate.

=== Libertarian and conservative ===
Activism is increasingly important on the political right in the United States and other countries, and some scholars have found: "the main split in conservatism has not been the long-standing one between economic and social conservatives detected in previous surveys (i.e., approximately the Libertarian right and the Christian right). Instead, it is between an emergent group (Activists) that fuses both ideologies and a less ideological category of 'somewhat conservative' Establishment Republicans." One example of this activism is the Tea Party movement.

Pew Research identified a "group of 'Staunch Conservatives' (11 percent of the electorate) who are strongly religious, across-the-board socially and economically conservative, and more politically active than other groups on the Right. They support the Tea Party at 72 percent, far higher than the next most favorable group." One analysis found a group estimated to be 4% of the electorate who identified both as libertarians and staunch religious conservatives "to be the core of this group of high-engagement voters" and labeled this group "Activists."

== Methods ==
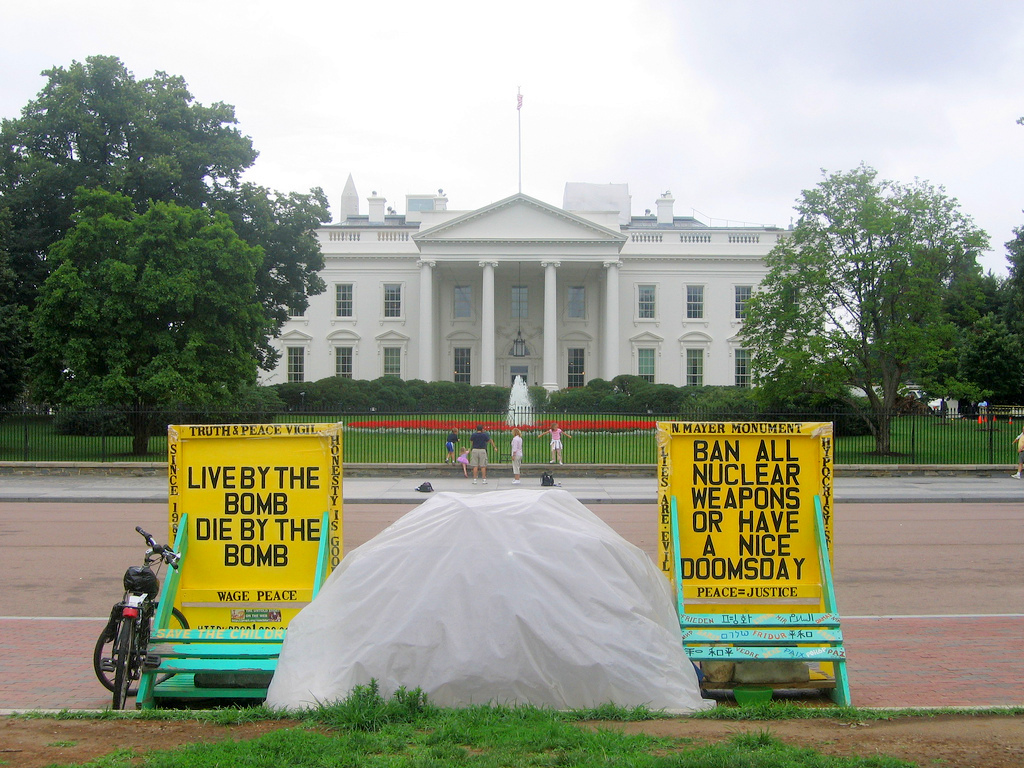
The longest running peace vigil in U.S. history, started by activist Thomas in 1981

Activists employ many different methods, or tactics, in pursuit of their goals. The tactics chosen are significant because they can determine how activists are perceived and what they are capable of accomplishing. For example, nonviolent tactics generally tend to garner more public sympathy than violent ones. and are more than twice as effective in achieving stated goals.

Historically, most activism has focused on creating substantive changes in the policy or practice of a government or industry. Some activists try to persuade people to change their behavior directly (see also direct action), rather than to persuade governments to change laws. For example, the cooperative movement seeks to build new institutions which conform to cooperative principles, and generally does not lobby or protest politically. Other activists try to persuade people or government policy to remain the same, in an effort to counter change.

Two forms of communicating protest messages that have been popular in the 21st century are the banner drop and the overpass protest. In both cases the size of the signs enables viewers to see the message even from a distance.

Greta Thunberg a Swedish climate activist is known for founding the Fridays for Future movement.

Charles Tilly developed the concept of a "repertoire of contention", which describes the full range of tactics available to activists at a given time and place. This repertoire consists of all of the tactics which have been proven to be successful by activists in the past, such as boycotts, petitions, marches, and sit-ins, and can be drawn upon by any new activists and social movements. Activists may also innovate new tactics of protest. These may be entirely novel, such as Douglas Schuler's idea of an "activist road trip", or may occur in response to police oppression or countermovement resistance. New tactics then spread to others through a social process known as diffusion, and if successful, may become new additions to the activist repertoire.

Activism is not an activity always performed by those who profess activism as a profession. The term "activist" may apply broadly to anyone who engages in activism, or narrowly limited to those who choose political or social activism as a vocation or characteristic practice.

Helena Alviar Garcia has combined activism with her work as a legal scholar, resulting in academia being seen as activism.

=== Political activism ===
Political activism includes activities such as political campaigning, lobbying, voting, or petitioning. Often political activists also publish their ideas themselves via newsletters, periodicals, presses, or digital media. Political activism does not depend on a specific ideology or national history, as can be seen, for example, in the importance of conservative British women in the 1920s on issues of tariffs.

Political activism, although often identified with young adults, occurs across peoples entire life-courses. Political activism on college campuses has been influential in left-wing politics since the 1960s, and recently there has been "a rise in conservative activism on US college campuses" and "it is common for conservative political organizations to donate money to relatively small conservative students groups".

While people's motivations for political activism may vary, one model examined activism in the British Conservative party and found three primary motivations: (1) "incentives, such as ambitions for elective office", (2) "a desire for the party to achieve policy goals" and (3) "expressive concerns, as measured by the strength of the respondent's partisanship".

In addition, very wealthy Americans can exercise political activism through massive financial support of political causes, and one study of the 400 richest Americans found "substantial evidence of liberal or right-wing activism that went beyond making contributions to political candidates." This study also found, in general, "old money is, if anything, more uniformly conservative than new money." Another study examined how "activism of the wealthy" has often increased inequality but is now sometimes used to decrease economic inequality.

=== Legal activism ===
Legal activism includes use of litigation in activism. Activists can also be public watchdogs and whistle blowers by holding government agencies accountable to oversight and transparency. In India, examples of legal activism include, Right to Information activism, wherein activists apply right to information queries to obtain data under its strict requirement for transparency and accountability, and public interest litigation, wherein activists submit petitions to courts seeking judicial review and intervention in subjects of interest. Judges may employ judicial activism to promote their conception of the social good. The definition of judicial activism and whether a specific decisions is activist are controversial political issues. The legal systems of different nations vary in the extent that judicial activism may be permitted.

=== Internet activism ===
The power of Internet activism came into a global lens with the Arab Spring protests starting in late 2010. People living in the Middle East and North African countries that were experiencing revolutions used social networking to communicate information about protests, including videos recorded on smart phones, which put the issues in front of an international audience. This was one of the first occasions in which social networking technology was used by citizen-activists to circumvent state-controlled media and communicate directly with the rest of the world. These types of practices of Internet activism were later picked up and used by other activists in subsequent mass mobilizations, such as the 15-M Movement in Spain in 2011, Occupy Gezi in Turkey in 2013, and more.

Online "left- and right-wing activists use digital and legacy media differently to achieve political goals". Left-wing online activists are usually more involved in traditional "hashtag activism" and offline protest, while right-wing activists may "manipulate legacy media, migrate to alternative platforms, and work strategically with partisan media to spread their messages". Research suggests right-wing online activists are more likely to use "strategic disinformation and conspiracy theories".

Internet activism may also refer to activism which focuses on protecting or changing the Internet itself, also known as digital rights. The Digital Rights movement consists of activists and organizations, such as the Electronic Frontier Foundation, who work to protect the rights of people in relation to new technologies, particularly concerning the Internet and other information and communications technologies.

Many contemporary activists now utilize new tactics through the Internet and other information and communication technologies (ICTs), also known as Internet activism or cyber-activism. Some scholars argue that many of these new tactics are digitally analogous to the traditional offline tools of contention. Other digital tactics may be entire new and unique, such as certain types of hacktivism. Together they form a new "digital repertoire of contention" alongside the existing offline one. The rising use of digital tools and platforms by activists has also increasingly led to the creation of decentralized networks of activists that are self-organized and leaderless, or what is known as franchise activism.

=== Economic activism ===
Economic activism involves using the economic power of government, consumers, and businesses for social and economic policy change. Both conservative and liberal groups use economic activism as a form of pressure to influence companies and organizations to oppose or support particular political, religious, or social values and behaviors. This may be done through ethical consumerism to reinforce "good" behavior and support companies one would like to succeed, or through boycott or divestment to penalize "bad" behavior and pressure companies to change or go out of business.

Brand activism is the type of activism in which business plays a leading role in the processes of social change. Applying brand activism, businesses show concern for the communities they serve, and their economic, social, and environmental problems, which allows businesses to build sustainable and long-term relationships with the customers and prospects. Kotler and Sarkar defined the phenomenon as an attempt by firms to solve the global problems its future customers and employees care about.

Consumer activism consists of activism carried out on behalf of consumers for consumer protection or by consumers themselves. For instance, activists in the free produce movement of the late 1700s protested against slavery by boycotting goods produced with slave labor. Today, vegetarianism, veganism, and freeganism are all forms of consumer activism which boycott certain types of products. Other examples of consumer activism include simple living, a minimalist lifestyle intended to reduce materialism and conspicuous consumption, and tax resistance, a form of direct action and civil disobedience in opposition to the government that is imposing the tax, to government policy, or as opposition to taxation in itself.

Shareholder activism involves shareholders using an equity stake in a corporation to put pressure on its management. The goals of activist shareholders range from financial (increase of shareholder value through changes in corporate policy, financing structure, cost cutting, etc.) to non-financial (disinvestment from particular countries, adoption of environmentally friendly policies, etc.).

=== Art activism ===
Design activism locates design at the center of promoting social change, raising awareness on social/political issues, or questioning problems associated with mass production and consumerism. Design Activism is not limited to one type of design.

Art activism or artivism utilizes the medium of visual art as a method of social or political commentary. Art activism can activate utopian thinking, which is imagining about an ideal society that is different from the current society, which is found to be effective for increasing collective action intentions.

Fashion activism was coined by Celine Semaan. Fashion activism is a type of activism that ignites awareness by giving consumers tools to support change, specifically in the fashion industry. It has been used as an umbrella term for many social and political movements that have taken place in the industry. Fashion Activism uses a participatory approach to a political activity.

Craft activism or craftivism is a type of visual activism that allows people to bring awareness to political or social discourse. It is a creative approach to activism as it allows people to send short and clear messages to society. People who contribute to craftivism are called "craftivists".

Activism in literature may publish written works that express intended or advocated reforms. Alternatively, literary activism may also seek to reform perceived corruption or entrenched systems of power within the publishing industry.

=== Science activism ===
Science activism may include efforts to better communicate science or advocate for funding of scientific research. It may also include efforts to increase perceived legitimacy of particular scientific fields or respond to the politicization of particular fields. Some forms of science or scholarly activism on political topics can reduce the separation of science from political advocacy and reduce the credibility of science. The March for Science held around the world in 2017 and 2018 were notable examples of science activism. Approaches to science activism vary from protests to more psychological, marketing-oriented approaches that takes into account such factors as individual sense of self, aversion to solutions to problems, and social perceptions.

=== Other methods ===
- Community building
  - Communities of practice
  - Cooperative
  - Cooperative movement
  - Grassroots
  - Guerrilla gardening
  - Transition movement
- Manipulation
  - Hacktivism
  - Mind control
  - Sabotage
  - Terrorism
  - War
- Media activism
  - Culture jamming
- Peace activism
  - Nonviolent resistance
  - Peace camps
  - Peace vigil
- Propaganda
  - Guerrilla communication
  - Soapbox
- Protest
  - Demonstration
  - Direct action
  - Performance Theater
  - Protest songs
  - Sit-in
  - Strikes
  - Boycott
- Strike action
  - Hunger strike

== Activism industry ==
Some groups and organizations participate in activism to such an extent that it can be considered as an industry. In these cases, activism is often done full-time, as part of an organization's core business. Many organizations in the activism industry are either non-profit organizations or non-governmental organizations with specific aims and objectives in mind. Most activist organizations do not manufacture goods, but rather mobilize personnel to recruit funds and gain media coverage.

The term activism industry has often been used to refer to outsourced fundraising operations. However, activist organizations engage in other activities as well. Lobbying, or the influencing of decisions made by government, is another activist tactic. Many groups, including law firms, have designated staff assigned specifically for lobbying purposes. In the United States, lobbying is regulated by the federal government.

Many government systems encourage public support of non-profit organizations by granting various forms of tax relief for donations to charitable organizations. Governments may attempt to deny these benefits to activists by restricting the political activity of tax-exempt organizations.

== See also ==
- Arab Spring
- Advocacy evaluation
- Advocacy group
- Advocacy
- Animal rights
- Asian American activism
- Awareness activism
- Civil disobedience
- Community leader
- Counterculture of the 1960s
- Cultural activism
- Demonstration (protest)
- Dissident
- Human rights activists
- List of activists
- List of peace activists
- Media manipulation
- Restorationism
- Slacktivism
- Social engineering (political science)
- Spiritual activism
- Student activism
- Water protectors
- Youth activism
