= Kurt Baschwitz =

German journalist ( 1886–1968)

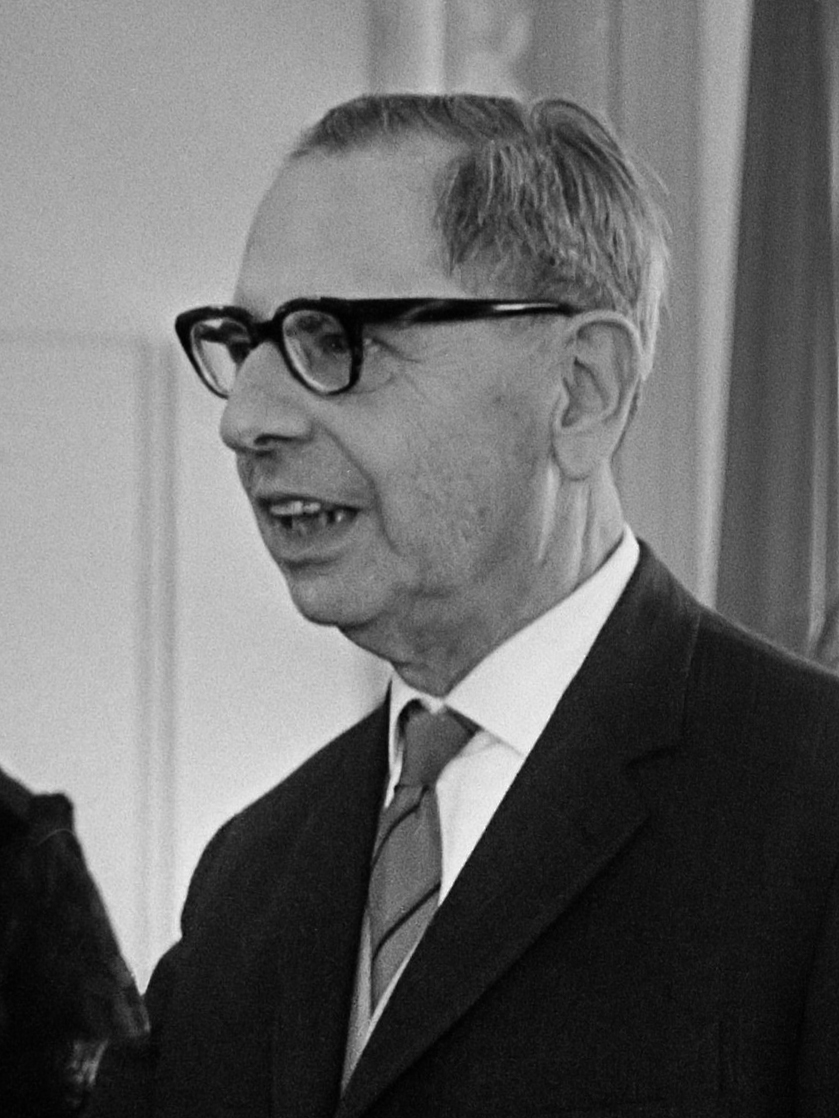
Kurt Baschwitz (1966)

Siegfried Kurt Baschwitz (2 February 1886, Offenburg – 6 January 1968 Amsterdam), was a journalist, a professor of press, propaganda and public opinion, scholar on newspapers, and crowd psychology.

Baschwitz, who, as was customary in German middle class, was known by his second name Kurt, was a German Jew and a friend of Otto Frank, the father of Anne Frank. Baschwitz was called upon as an expert to advise on the publication of the Diary of Anne Frank and later again authenticate it.

== Education ==
Baschwitz studied at several universities in Germany and graduated in economics and held pronounced liberal views. He was awarded a doctorate with a thesis supervised by social reformer, Lujo Brentano.

== Career in Germany ==
After conclusion of his academic studies Kurt Baschwitz started his career as a journalist writing for several German national newspapers.

During World War I he was correspondent for a Hamburg newspaper in neutral Rotterdam and learned to speak Dutch. Influenced deeply by allied atrocity propaganda and what he considered to be humiliating terms forced on German at the end of the war, his political opinions veered considerably towards the right although he soon recognized the potential dangers of extremism in German society.

In 1923 he wrote his first book, about the reaction of public opinion to propaganda and national stereotypes on Germans abroad. In addition to his work as a journalist he became an erudite and popular public speaker, including on radio. In 1930 he was offered a position on the faculty of the University of Heidelberg but he refused, on account of the growing anti-Semitic climate in Germany which would make his life and that of his family difficult. He had meanwhile become editor-in-chief of the journal of newspaper publishers, but was fired as a consequence of the new anti-Jewish laws.

Baschwitz continued to write on the history of the press, the hatred of groups in society and censorship.

== Career in the Netherlands ==
Early in 1933, after Hitler came to power and when it was no longer possible for his work to be published in Germany, Baschwitz fled from Nazi-Germany to the Netherlands. There he started to work for the research agency of Alfred Wiener which gathered information about antisemitism and the dark side of German National Socialism.

In 1935 he started to lecture on the history of newspapers at the University of Amsterdam; In 1936-37 he was also offered a position with the International Institute of Social History.

In 1938 he published works on the history of newspapers, and on the abuse of mass psychology which included a strong attack on Nazi behaviour.

== During the Nazi Occupation of the Netherlands ==
During the German occupation of the Netherlands Baschwitz went into hiding. In 1942, he got arrested by German police during a street razzia and was brought to Westerbork transit camp. A few days later, his daughter Isa (Gisela) Baschwitz, who later became active in the anti-Nazi Dutch Resistance movement, achieved his release with the help of a combination of real and false identity papers.

== After World War 2 ==
After World War II Kurt Baschwitz was reinstated as a private lecturer and then an ordinary lecturer at the University of Amsterdam.

In 1948 he became associate professor in the Faculty of Political and Social Sciences and four years later he was made full professor in press science, public opinion, and mass psychology.

In July 1948 he founded and became the first director of the Dutch Institute for the Science of the Press which organized courses for the training of young journalists, as well as established ones. Baschwitz was considered to be a pioneer in communication science and mass psychology and contributed much to the international exchange of information and research among scholars in the field. First as a driving force behind the International Society for "Publicistics", and then as a key figure preparing the International Association of Mass Communication Research IAMCR.

After 1945, one of his major efforts was to rediscover information on the field had been lost because of the war and on the previous underground press. Gazette, the international journal that he founded in 1955, acted as a liaison centre for research and researchers from different parts of the world. His later works all dealt with the mass psychology of witch hunts, but were also a reflection on the mechanisms of mass persecutions in general, and those of Jews in particular. His magnum opus, in his own opinion, Hexen und Hexenprozesse: Geschichte eines Massenwahns und seiner Bekaempfung which discussed methods of fighting attempts at mass delusion appeared in 1963 and was printed in several languages. Baschwitz also contributed to the founding of a ‘seminarium’ for mass psychology, public opinion and propaganda at the University of Amsterdam. In 1972 it was renamed the Baschwitz Institute for collective behavior studies, before merging with the public opinion section within the department for communication studies in 1985.

== Literary works ==
- Der Massenwahn, seine Wirkung und seine Beherrschung, 1923 (1932, revised edition)
- De strijd met den duivel. De heksenprocessen in het licht der massapsychologie, 1948
- De krant door alle tijden, 1938
- Du und die Masse, 1938, 1951 (second edition)
- "Hexen und Hexenprozesse", 1963

== Biography ==
- Jaap van Ginneken Kurt Baschwitz - A Pioneer of Communication Studies and Social Psychology. Amsterdam: Amsterdam University Press 2017. ISBN 978-94-6298-604-6. (Includes translated fragments of his work, abbreviated edition in Dutch).

== See also ==
- Rita Kohnstamm (nl)
