= Electronic tagging =

Form of surveillance using a body-worn electronic device

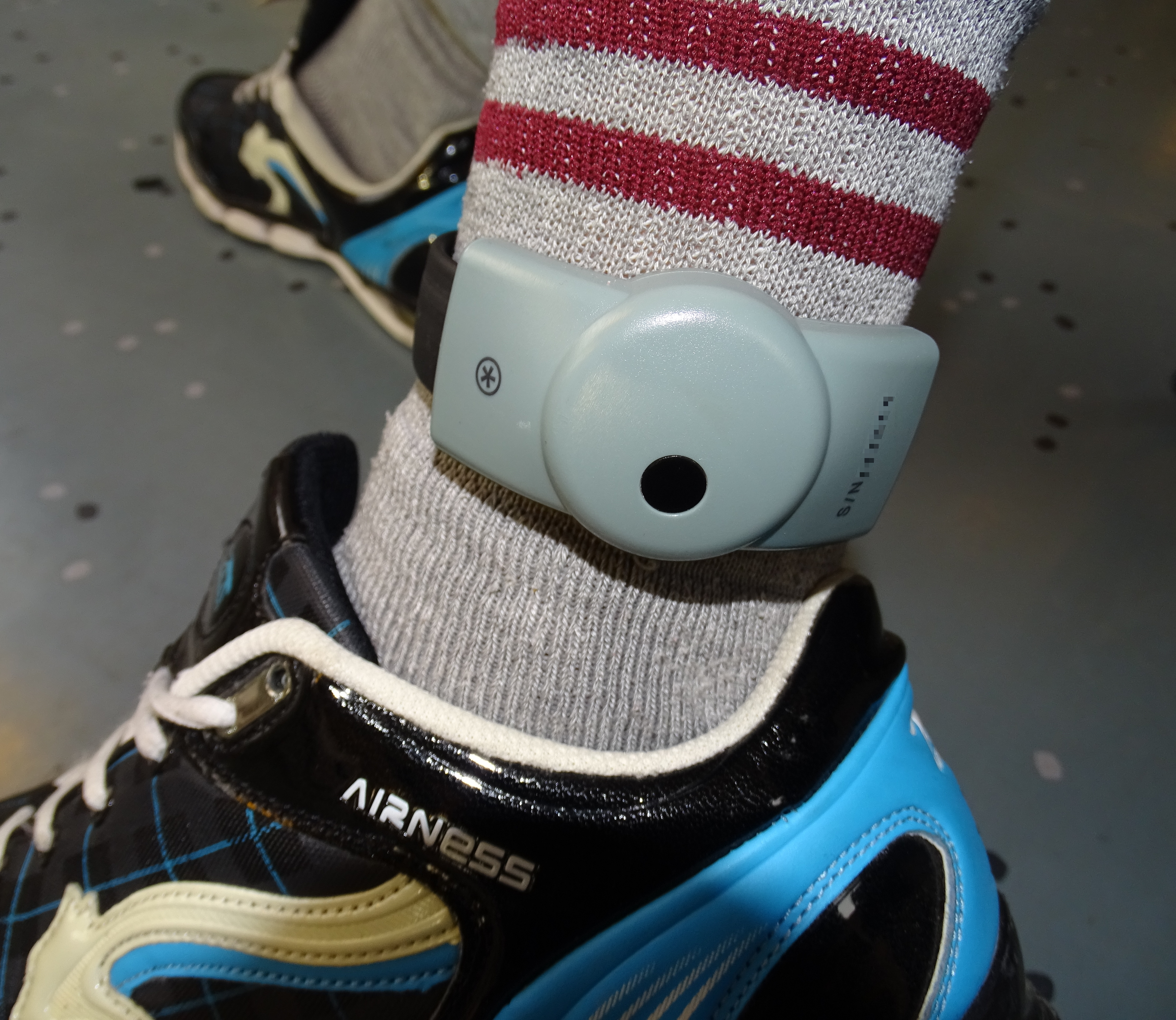
An electronic location-tracking device worn around the ankle

Electronic tagging is a form of surveillance that uses an electronic device affixed to a person to monitor their location or physiological state. It is a specific application of asset tracking technology where the "asset" being monitored is a person.

In some jurisdictions, an electronic tag fitted above the ankle is used for individuals as part of their bail or probation conditions. It is also used in healthcare settings and in immigration contexts. Electronic tagging can be used in combination with a GPS tracking unit for wide-area monitoring, but for short-range monitoring of a person, radio frequency technology is often used.

== History ==
The electronic monitoring of humans found its first commercial applications in the 1980s. Portable transceivers that could record the location of volunteers were first developed by a group of researchers at Harvard University in the early 1960s. The researchers cited the psychological perspective of B. F. Skinner as underpinning for their academic project. The portable electronic tag was called behavior transmitter-reinforcer and could transmit data two-ways between a base station and a volunteer who simulated a young adult offender. Messages were supposed to be sent to the tag, so as to provide positive reinforcement to the young offender and thus assist in rehabilitation. The head of this research project was Ralph Kirkland Schwitzgebel and his twin brother collaborator, Robert Schwitzgebel (family name later shortened to Gable). The main base-station antenna was mounted on the roof of the Old Cambridge Baptist Church; the minister was the dean of the Harvard Divinity School.

Reviewers of the prototype electronic tagging strategy were skeptical. In 1966, the Harvard Law Review ridiculed the electronic tags as Schwitzgebel Machine and a myth emerged, according to which the prototype electronic tagging project used brain implants and transmitted verbal instructions to volunteers. The editor of a well-known U.S. government publication, Federal Probation, rejected a manuscript submitted by Ralph Kirkland Schwitzgebel, and included a letter which read in part: "I get the impression from your article that we are going to make automatons out of our parolees and that the parole officer of the future will be an expert in telemetry, sitting at his large computer, receiving calls day and night, and telling his parolees what to do in all situations and circumstances [...] Perhaps we should also be thinking about using electronic devices to rear our children. Since they do not have built-in consciences to tell them right from wrong, all they would have to do is to push the 'mother' button, and she would take over the responsibility for decision-making." In 1973, Laurence Tribe published information on the failed attempts by those involved in the project to find a commercial application for electronic tagging.

In the U.S., the 1970s saw an end of rehabilitative sentencing, including for example discretionary parole release. Those found guilty of a criminal offense were sent to prison, leading to a sudden increase in the prison population. Probation became more common, as judges saw the potential of electronic tagging, leading to an increasing emphasis on surveillance. Advances in computer-aided technology made offender monitoring feasible and affordable. The Schwitzgebel prototype had been built from surplus missile tracking equipment. A collection of early electronic monitoring equipment is housed at the National Museum of Psychology in Akron, Ohio.

The attempt to monitor offenders became moribund until, in 1982, an Arizona state district judge, Jack Love, convinced a former sales representative of Honeywell Information Systems, Michael T. Goss, to start a monitoring company, National Incarceration Monitor and Control Services (NIMCOS). The NIMCOS company built several credit card-sized transmitters that could be strapped onto an ankle. The electronic ankle tag transmitted a radio signal every 60 seconds, which could be picked up by a receiver that was no more than 45 metres (148 ft) away from the electronic tag. The receiver could be connected to a telephone, so that the data from the electronic ankle tag could be sent to a mainframe computer. The design aim of the electronic tag was the reporting of a potential home detention breach. In 1983, Love imposed home curfew on three offenders who had been sentenced to probation. The home detention was a probation condition and entailed 30 days of electronic monitoring at home. The NIMCOS electronic ankle tag was trialed on those three probationers, two of whom re-offended. Thus, while the goal of home confinement was satisfied, the aim of reducing crime through probation was not.

== Additional technologies ==
=== Sweat alcohol content monitor ===
According to Alcohol Monitoring Systems (AMS), Secure Continuous Remote Alcohol Monitoring (SCRAM) is currently available in 35 U.S. states.

On 31 March 2021, in England, so-called sobriety tags started being rolled out for some offenders who commit alcohol-related crimes after testing the tags in Wales in October of the previous year. It monitors sweat samples every 30 minutes and alerts the probation service if alcohol is detected.

== Modern device architectures ==
The design of electronic monitoring hardware has evolved significantly since the first RF-based ankle tags of the 1980s. The U.S. National Institute of Justice (NIJ) Standard 1004.00 classifies devices into two types: one-piece configurations, in which all tracking and communication components reside within a single body-attached unit; and multi-piece (or two-piece) configurations, in which a body-attached tether communicates via short-range radio with a separate body-proximate tracking device.

=== One-piece GPS devices ===
In a one-piece configuration, the GPS receiver, cellular modem, battery, anti-tamper sensors, and attachment strap are integrated into a single ankle-worn unit. This architecture eliminates the short-range wireless link between tether and tracker that multi-piece systems require, thereby removing a potential point of failure that can generate false proximity-violation alerts. One-piece devices simplify logistics for supervising agencies, as only one unit per participant needs to be inventoried, charged, issued, and recovered.

Modern one-piece GPS ankle monitors typically employ multi-constellation GNSS positioning (combining GPS, GLONASS, Galileo, and BeiDou), supplemented by Wi-Fi and cell-tower triangulation for indoor coverage. Reported outdoor positioning accuracy in newer devices reaches sub-two-meter circular error probable (CEP), a substantial improvement over the 10-meter accuracy threshold specified in NIJ Standard 1004.00.

Key trade-offs of one-piece designs include a larger and heavier form factor compared to a simple RF tether, and shorter battery life due to the power demands of continuous GPS and cellular operation. Typical battery life for one-piece devices ranges from 24 hours to 7 days, depending on reporting interval and cellular technology used. The introduction of LTE-M and NB-IoT low-power wide-area network protocols has extended standalone battery life, with some devices achieving 7-day intervals at 5-minute reporting frequency.

=== Multi-piece systems ===
In a multi-piece (two-piece) configuration, a lightweight body-attached tether — typically a small ankle bracelet — communicates via Bluetooth Low Energy or 433 MHz radio frequency with a separate body-proximate tracking unit that the participant carries or wears. The tether handles tamper detection and proximity monitoring, while the separate unit handles GPS positioning and cellular reporting.

Multi-piece systems allow the ankle-worn component to be substantially smaller and lighter (as low as 17–18 grams), since it does not need to house GPS or cellular hardware. However, NIJ Standard 1004.00 requires that multi-piece systems detect and alert on separation of the two components within 5 minutes, and communicate this alert to the supervising agency within 4 additional minutes. If the participant fails to carry the tracking unit, the system loses GPS positioning capability even though the tether remains attached.

== Anti-tamper detection technologies ==
Tamper detection is a critical requirement for offender tracking systems. NIJ Standard 1004.00 mandates testing for both strap removal by cutting and strap removal by stretching, requiring that the system detect and alert on such attempts. Several detection technologies are in use:

=== Capacitive and conductive sensing ===
Many ankle monitors use capacitive or conductive sensors embedded in the strap that detect changes in electrical properties when the strap is cut, removed, or significantly deformed. These systems measure skin contact continuity or strap circuit integrity. While widely deployed, capacitive sensing can be affected by environmental factors such as moisture, sweat accumulation, or dry skin conditions, potentially generating false tamper alerts that require officer response and triage.

=== Photoplethysmography (PPG) ===
Some devices use photoplethysmography (PPG) sensors — the same technology used in fitness wearables to measure heart rate — to verify continuous skin contact. The presence of a pulse signal confirms the device is on a living person. However, PPG-based detection can produce false positives when signal quality degrades due to factors such as skin pigmentation variability, poor sensor contact, excessive movement, or cold ambient temperatures that reduce peripheral blood flow.

=== Optical fiber detection ===
An alternative approach uses an optical fiber loop embedded within the strap material. A continuous light signal is transmitted through the fiber; any physical interruption of the fiber — whether by cutting, stretching beyond tolerance, or obstruction — immediately terminates the optical signal and triggers a deterministic tamper alert. Because the detection is based on a binary physical state (light signal present or absent), this method is inherently resistant to the environmental false positives that affect capacitive and PPG-based systems. The severed fiber also provides physical forensic evidence of a tamper attempt that persists after the event, unlike electronic-only detection methods where alert data exists only in system logs.

== Performance standards and certification ==
=== NIJ Standard 1004.00 ===
Published in July 2016, NIJ Standard 1004.00 establishes minimum performance requirements and test methods for offender tracking systems. The standard was developed by a Special Technical Committee comprising practitioners from agencies including the American Probation and Parole Association, the American Correctional Association, state departments of corrections, and federal probation offices, together with technical experts from test laboratories and research centers.

The standard defines requirements across five categories: safety, technical operation, circumvention, software, and robustness. Key benchmarks include:

- GPS signal acquisition within 2 minutes
- Outdoor accuracy within 10 meters 90% of the time
- Indoor accuracy within 30 meters 90% of the time (in residential-shielding conditions)
- Strap removal detection (both cutting and stretching) with alert generation
- Zone violation alert within 4 minutes (active tracking)
- Multi-piece separation detection within 5 minutes
- Low battery alert before complete discharge
- Water immersion and environmental robustness testing
- Electromagnetic compatibility testing

The standard also includes optional test methods for detecting metallic shielding, cellular jamming, and GPS jamming attempts.

=== European regulatory framework ===
Electronic monitoring devices sold in EU member states must comply with the Radio Equipment Directive (RED) 2014/53/EU, which covers radio equipment safety, electromagnetic compatibility, and efficient use of the radio spectrum. Since August 2025, internet-connected radio equipment — including GPS ankle monitors with cellular connectivity — must also comply with the EN 18031 series of cybersecurity standards, which address network protection, personal data privacy, and fraud prevention.

Rechargeable lithium-ion batteries used in ankle-worn devices are subject to safety testing under IEC 62133-2, which specifies requirements for portable sealed secondary cells including tests for overcharging, short-circuiting, thermal abuse, and mechanical shock. Transportation of devices containing lithium batteries must comply with UN 38.3 testing requirements.

Devices are also typically tested for ingress protection (IP) ratings under IEC 60529; a rating of IP67 or IP68 is common for ankle-worn devices to ensure resistance to sweat, rain, and accidental submersion.

== Non-justice-system uses ==
=== Medical and health ===
The use of electronic monitoring in medicine, especially as it relates to the tagging of the elderly and people with dementia, has generated controversy and media attention. Inmates of care homes can be tagged with the same electronic monitors used to keep track of young offenders. For people suffering from dementia, electronic monitoring might be beneficially used to prevent them from wandering away. The controversy regarding medical use relates to two arguments, one about the safety of the patients and the other about their privacy and human rights. At over 40%, there is a high prevalence of wandering among patients with dementia. Of the several methods deployed to keep them from wandering, it is reported that 44% of wanderers with dementia have been kept behind closed doors at some point. Other solutions have included constant surveillance, use of makeshift alarms, and the use of various drugs that carry the risk of adverse effects.

=== Commercial ===
Smartphones feature location-based apps to use information from global positioning system (GPS) networks to determine the phone's approximate location.

=== Vehicular ===
The principles of electronic tagging, using a device to monitor the location and status of a remote asset, are a foundational component of modern fleet management. Commercial vehicles are often equipped with a vehicle tracking system that uses a telematic control unit to communicate with GPS satellites for automatic vehicle location. This is a key part of intelligent transportation systems and modern fleet digitalization. App developers have integrated this telematics technology with mobile apps, allowing passengers of public transport to receive accurate timetables via a journey planner.

== Effectiveness ==
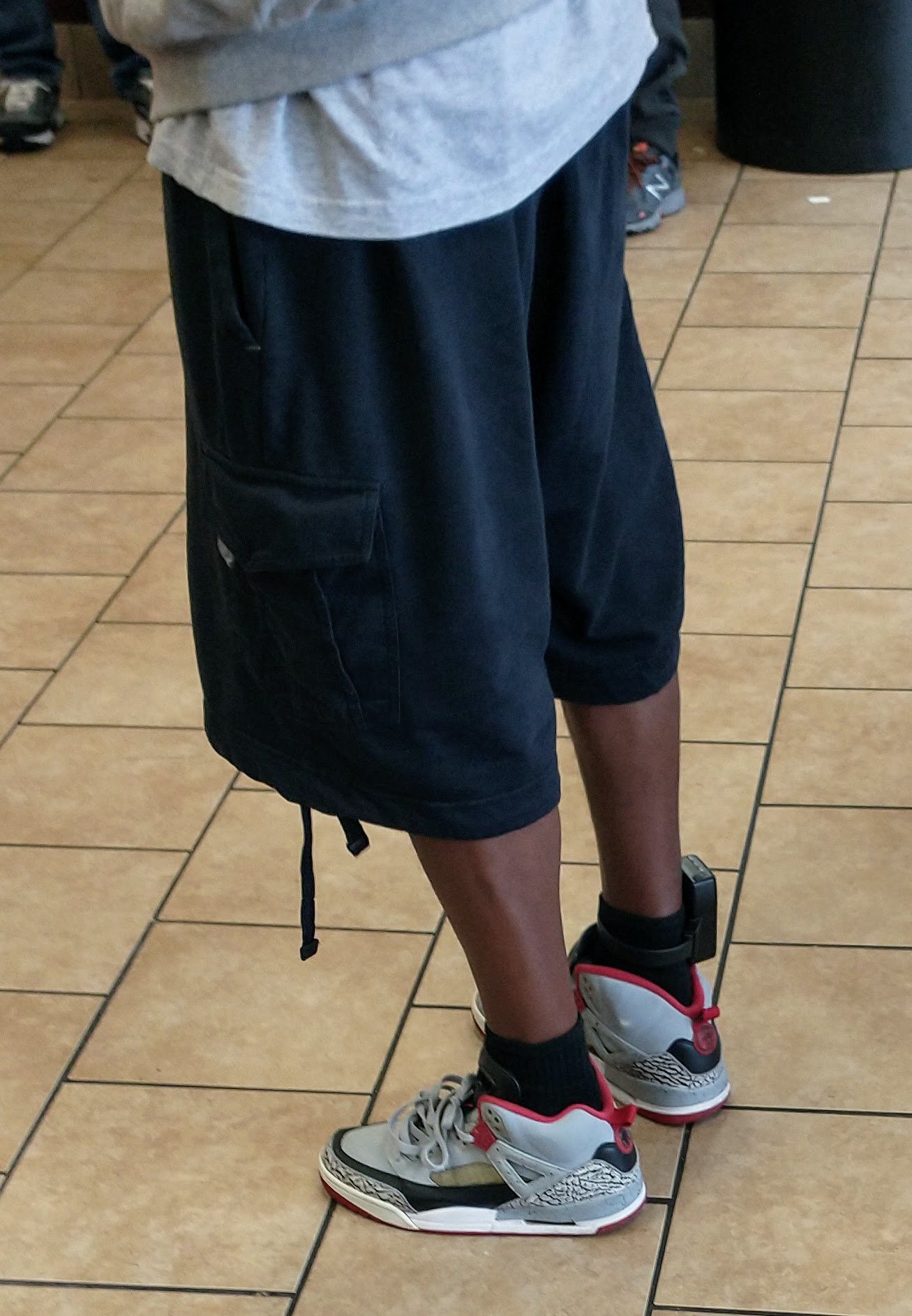
An ankle monitor used for electronic tagging in Massachusetts

The use of ankle bracelets or other electronic monitoring devices has been found to be effective in some research studies and may deter crime.

Several factors have been identified as necessary to render electronic monitoring effective: appropriately selecting offenders, robust and appropriate technology, fitting tags promptly, responding to breaches promptly, and communication between the criminal justice system and contractors. The Quaker Council for European Affairs thinks that for electronic monitoring to be effective, it should serve to halt a developing criminal career.

The National Audit Office in England and Wales commissioned a survey to examine the experiences of electronically monitored offenders and the members of their family. The survey revealed that there was common agreement among survey respondents that electronic monitoring was a more effective punitive measure than fines, and that it was generally more effective than community service. An interviewed offender is credited with saying: "You learn more about other crimes [in prison] and I think it gives you a taste to do other crimes because you've sat listening to other people."

In 2006, Kathy Padgett, William Bales, and Thomas Bloomberg conducted an evaluation of 75,661 Florida offenders placed on home detention from 1998 to 2002, a small percentage of whom were required to wear an electronic monitoring device. Offenders with electronic tagging were compared to those on home detention without electronic tagging. The factors thought to influence the success or failure of community supervision, including type of electronic monitoring device used and criminal history, were measured. The results showed that offenders who wore electronic tags were both 91.2 percent less likely to abscond and 94.7 percent less likely to commit new offenses, than unmonitored offenders.

== Criticisms ==
The electronic monitoring of a person, on whom an electronic tag is fitted, does not physically restrain them from leaving a certain area, nor does it prevent them from re-offending, which is the primary aim of probation. Furthermore, the public perception of home detention is that it is a form of lenient punishment.

In the US in 1990, Ronald Corbett and Gary T. Marx criticized the use of electronic monitoring in a paper presented at the Annual Meeting of the American Society of Criminology, Baltimore. In the paper, which was later published in the Justice Quarterly, the authors described 'the new surveillance' technology as sharing some ethos with the information-gathering techniques found in maximum-security prisons, thereby allowing them to diffuse into the broader society. They remarked that 'we appear to be moving toward, rather than away from, becoming a "maximum-security society". The authors acknowledged the data mining capacity of electronic monitoring devices when they stated that "data in many different forms, from widely separated geographical areas, organizations, and time periods, can easily be merged and analyzed".

Many US electronic monitoring programs were not staffed appropriately in 2013. George Drake, a consultant who worked on improving the systems said "Many times when an agency is budgeted for electronic-monitoring equipment, it is only budgeted for the devices themselves". He added that the situation was "like buying a hammer and expecting a house to be built. It's simply a tool, and it requires a professional to use that tool and run the program." Drake warned that programs can get out of control if officials do not develop stringent protocols for how to respond to alerts and do not manage how alerts are generated: "I see agencies with so many alerts that they can't deal with them. They end up just throwing their hands up and saying they can't keep up with them." In Colorado, a review of alert and event data, obtained from the Colorado Department of Corrections under an open-records request, was conducted by matching the names of parolees who appeared in that data with those who appeared in jail arrest records. The data revealed that 212 parole officers were saddled with the duty of responding to nearly 90,000 alerts and notification generated by electronic monitoring devices in the six months reviewed.

== Notable instances ==
- English professional footballer Jermaine Pennant played a Premier League match in 2005 while wearing an electronic tag; he had received the tag for drunk-driving and driving while disqualified.
- Roman Polanski, one of the most famous fugitives from American justice in the world, was arrested in 2009 in Switzerland. The terms of his release included $4.5 million bail, house arrest wearing an ankle bracelet at his chalet, known as Milky Way, in the Swiss ski resort of Gstaad, after having spent sixty-seven days in a Zürich detention center.
- In the 2019 Dateline NBC episode "Unchecked Evil", the man who raped and murdered a young woman about to graduate from Ohio State University was on parole, despite having committed those crimes and others while wearing an ankle tag that was not actively being monitored.

== Jurisdictions ==
=== United Kingdom ===
Those subject to electronic monitoring may be given curfews as part of bail conditions, sentenced under the Criminal Justice Act 2003 in England and Wales (with separate legislation applying in Scotland). Alternatively offenders may be released from a prison on a Home Detention Curfew. Released prisoners under home detention are allowed out during curfew hours only for:

- A wedding or funeral (service only) of a close relative
- A job interview
- Acting as a witness in court
- Emergencies.

Additionally, electronic monitoring may be used for those subject to a curfew given under the Terrorism Prevention and Investigation Measures Act 2011 (previously known as a control order under the Prevention of Terrorism Act 2005)

Since electronically monitored curfews were rolled out throughout England and Wales their use has increased sharply, from 9,000 cases in 1999–2000 to 53,000 in 2004–05. In 2004–05, the Home Office spent £102.3 million on the electronic monitoring of curfews and electronically monitored curfews are considered cheaper than custody.

Typically, offenders are fitted with an electronic tag around their ankle which sends a regular signal to a receiver unit installed in their home. Some systems are connected to a landline in the case where GSM is not available, whilst most arrangements utilize the mobile phone system to communicate with the monitoring company. If the tag is not functioning or within range of the base station during curfew hours, or if the base is disconnected from the power supply, or the base station is moved then the monitoring company are alerted, who in turn, notify the appropriate authority such as the police, the National Probation Service or the prison the person was released from.

In 2012, the Policy Exchange think tank examined the use of electronic monitoring in England and Wales and made comparisons with technologies and models seen in other jurisdictions, particularly the United States. The report was critical of the Ministry of Justice's model of a fully privatized service, which gave little scope for police or probation services to make use of electronic monitoring. The report, Future of Corrections, also criticized the cost of the service, highlighting an apparent differential between what the UK taxpayer was charged and what could be found in the United States.

Subsequently, there were a number of scandals in relation to electronic monitoring in England and Wales, with a criminal investigation opened by the Serious Fraud Office into the activities of Serco and G4S. As a result of the investigation, Serco agreed to repay £68.5 million to the taxpayer and G4S agreed to repay £109 million. The duopoly were subsequently stripped of their contract, with Capita taking over the contract. In 2017, another criminal investigation saw police make a number of arrests in relation to allegations that at least 32 criminals on tag had paid up to £400 to Capita employees in order to have 'loose' tags fitted, allowing them to remove their tags.

The monitoring of sex offenders via electronic tagging is currently in debate due to certain rights offenders have in England and Wales.

Electronic tagging has begun being used on psychiatric and dementia patients, prompting concern from mental health advocates who state that the practice is demeaning.

In June 2022, the British Home Office announced a one-year pilot to track migrants who arrived on small boats on "dangerous and unnecessary routes" with GPS devices that will help "maintain regular contact" and more "effectively process their claims".

=== Australia and New Zealand ===
In Australia and New Zealand existing law permits the use of electronic monitoring as condition for bail, probation or parole. But, according to the 2004 Standard Guidelines for Corrections in Australia the surveillance must be proportionate to the risk of re-offense. It is also required that, the surveillance of the offender is minimally intrusive for other people who live at the premises. Electronic tagging of a person is part of different electronic monitoring systems in Australia. Correctional agency statistics are collected in Australia for so called "restricted movement orders". In South Australia, a drive-by facility allows the monitorer to drive past a building in which the tagged person is supposed to be.

In New Zealand, the electronic tagging of offenders began 1999, when home detention could be imposed instead of imprisonment. By late July 2023, Stuff reported that 2,230 teenagers had been subject to electronic monitoring since 2019, citing figures released by the Department of Corrections. The number of 13 year olds wearing ankle bracelets rose from one in 2019/2020 to nine in 2022/2023. The vast majority teenagers subject to electronic monitoring were males, with 2,011 reported in July 2023.

=== Brazil ===
In August 2010, Brazil awarded a GPS Offender Monitoring contract to kick start its monitoring of offenders and management of the Brazilian governments early release programme.

=== South Africa ===
Electronic monitoring as a pilot project was started in March 2012, involving 150 offenders, mostly prisoners serving life terms. The project was rolled out to reduce the South Africa's prison population. It consequently would also reduce the taxpayer's burden on correctional facilities. South Africa locks up more people than any other country on the continent.

== See also ==
- Decarceration in the United States
- Electronic monitoring in the United States
- Real-time locating system
