= Behavioural sciences =

Study of cognition leading to behaviour

Behavioural science is the branch of science concerned with theorizing on categorizing and judging human behaviour. It sits in the interstice between fields such as psychology, cognitive science, neuroscience, behavioral biology, behavioral genetics and social science. While the term can technically be applied to the study of behaviour amongst all living organisms, it is nearly always used with reference to humans as the primary target of investigation (though animals may be studied in some instances, e.g. invasive techniques).

== History and scope ==
Behavioural science has its roots in the systematic study of human and animal behaviour, shaped by work in psychology, behavioural neuroscience, and related disciplines. Early experimental psychologists such as B.F. Skinner, Ivan Pavlov, and John B. Watson developed methods for observing, measuring, and modifying behaviour, while advances in neuroscience connected behaviour to brain structure, neurochemistry, and physiology.

Advances in neuroscience deepened the understanding of the biological basis of behaviour, linking neural structures, neurotransmitters, and physiological processes to observable actions. This integration of biology and psychology helped establish behavioural neuroscience as a core branch of the field.

The behavioural sciences encompass both natural and social scientific disciplines, including various branches of psychology, neuroscience and biobehavioural sciences, behavioural economics and certain branches of criminology, sociology and political science. This interdisciplinary nature allows behavioural scientists to coordinate findings from psychological experiments, genetics and neuroimaging, self-report studies, interspecies and cross-cultural comparisons, and correlational and longitudinal designs to understand the nature, frequency, mechanisms, causes and consequences of given behaviours.

With respect to the applied behavioural science and behavioural insights, the focus is usually narrower, tending to encompass cognitive psychology, social psychology and behavioural economics generally, and invoking other more specific fields (e.g. health psychology) where needed. In applied settings behavioural scientists exploit their knowledge of cognitive biases, heuristics, and peculiarities of how decision-making is affected by various factors to develop behaviour change interventions or develop policies which 'nudge' people to acting more auspiciously (see Applications below).

=== Future and emerging techniques ===
Robila explains how using modern technology to study and understand behavioral patterns on a greater scale, such as artificial intelligence, machine learning, and greater data has a future in brightening up behavioral science assistance/ research. Creating cutting-edge therapies and interventions with immersive technology like virtual reality/ AI would also be beneficial to behavioral science future(s). These concepts are only a hint of the many paths behavioral science may take in the future.

== Universities with significant behavioural science labs ==
Several universities are recognized for their prominent behavioural science research programs and laboratories. These institutions integrate interdisciplinary approaches combining psychology, neuroscience, and computational methods to advance understanding of behaviour and develop applied interventions.

Notable examples include:

- Stanford University: home to the Stanford Behavioral Lab and the Center for Computational, Evolutionary, and Human Genomics, with research spanning social cognition, decision-making, and neuroeconomics.
- Harvard University: hosts the Center for Brain Science and the Harvard Decision Science Laboratory, focusing on neural and psychological mechanisms of behaviour.
- University of Cambridge: known for its Behavioural and Clinical Neuroscience Institute and extensive research on decision-making and social behaviour.
- University of California, Berkeley: with laboratories such as the Berkeley Social Interaction Lab and the Helen Wills Neuroscience Institute, conducting studies in social behaviour, cognitive neuroscience, and behavioural interventions.

These universities research behavioural science extensively and integrate multiple disciplines to generate insights that inform fields ranging from public health, clinical research to technology design.

== Methods and approaches ==
Behavioural science has evolved through a combination of experimental, observational, and physiological techniques, beginning with early laboratory work and extending into sophisticated modern technologies.

Early experimental methods

In the early 20th century, pioneers such as B.F. Skinner developed apparatuses like the operant conditioning chamber ("Skinner box") to systematically measure learning and reinforcement in animals. These setups allowed precise control over stimuli and automated recording of responses, making it possible to quantify complex behaviours over extended periods. Similarly, Ivan Pavlov's classical conditioning experiments used controlled delivery of stimuli to study associative learning in dogs, establishing protocols still used in modified forms today.

Invasive physiological techniques

Before the advent of non-invasive imaging, behavioural science relied heavily on invasive methods in animal research. These included targeted lesion studies, in which specific brain regions were surgically damaged to examine resulting behavioural changes, and intracranial electrode implantation to record single-unit activity from individual neurons. Techniques such as microdialysis allowed researchers to sample neurotransmitter concentrations in living tissue during behavioural tasks. These methods established causal links between neural structures, neurochemistry, and observed behaviour.

Transition to non-invasive neuroimaging

The late 20th century saw the rise of non-invasive brain imaging methods for studying humans. Functional magnetic resonance imaging (fMRI) measures changes in blood oxygenation (BOLD signals) to map brain regions active during cognitive, emotional, or decision-making tasks. Electroencephalography (EEG) records electrical activity from the scalp, providing millisecond-level resolution of neural events, while magnetoencephalography (MEG) captures magnetic fields produced by neural currents. These tools allow researchers to observe brain function without physical penetration, expanding behavioural science to human populations at scale.

Computational and modelling approaches

Modern research increasingly uses reinforcement learning models, Bayesian decision frameworks, and agent-based simulations to formalise behavioural theories. Machine learning techniques applied to large-scale behavioural datasets enable prediction of individual and group decision patterns in domains ranging from health interventions to consumer choice.

By integrating early invasive methods with today's advanced neuroimaging, physiological monitoring, and computational modelling, behavioural science is able to investigate behaviour from its neural origins to its expression in complex, real-world environments.

== Applications ==
Insights from several pure disciplines across behavioural sciences are explored by various applied disciplines and practiced in the context of everyday life and business.

Consumer behaviour, for instance, is the study of the decision making process consumers make when purchasing goods or services. It studies the way consumers recognise problems and discover solutions. Behavioural science is applied in this study by examining the patterns consumers make when making purchases, the factors that influenced those decisions, and how to take advantage of these patterns.

Organisational behaviour is the application of behavioural science in a business setting. It studies what motivates employees, how to make them work more effectively, what influences this behaviour, and how to use these patterns in order to achieve the company's goals. Managers often use organisational behaviour to better lead their employees.

Using insights from psychology and economics, behavioural science can be leveraged to understand how individuals make decisions regarding their health and ultimately reduce disease burden through interventions such as loss aversion, framing, defaults, nudges, and more.

Other applied disciplines of behavioural science include operations research and media psychology.

== Notable behavioural scientists ==
1. B.F. Skinner - Behaviourist, pioneer of operant conditioning and schedules of reinforcement.
2. John B. Watson - Early proponent of controlled behavioural experiments.
3. Ivan Pavlov - Discovered classical conditioning in dogs.
4. Albert Bandura - Social learning theory, observational learning, self-efficacy.
5. Eric Kandel - Memory and synaptic plasticity research.
6. Michael Gazzaniga - Split-brain research, cognitive neuroscience of consciousness.
7. Robert Sapolsky - Stress physiology, primate behaviour, neuroendocrinology.

== See also ==
- Behaviour
  - Human behaviour
  - loss aversion
- List of academic disciplines
- Science
  - Fields of science
    - Natural sciences
    - Social sciences
  - History of science
  - History of technology

== Selected bibliography ==
- George Devereux: From anxiety to method in the behavioral sciences, The Hague, Paris. Mouton & Co, 1967
- Fred N. Kerlinger (1979). Behavioural Research: A Conceptual Approach. New York: Holt, Rinehart & Winston. ISBN 0-03-013331-9.
- E.D. Klemke, R. Hollinger & A.D. Kline, (eds.) (1980). Introductory Readings in the Philosophy of Science. Prometheus Books, New York.
- Neil J. Smelser & Paul B. Baltes, eds. (2001). International Encyclopedia of the Social & Behavioral Sciences, 26 v. Oxford: Elsevier. ISBN 978-0-08-043076-8
- Mills, J. A. (1998). Control a history of behavioral psychology. New York University Press.
