= International Encyclopedia of the Social & Behavioral Sciences =

26-volume work published by Elsevier on social and behavioral science

- First edition
- Editors: Neil J. Smelser Paul B. Baltes (1st edition); James D. Wright (2nd edition)
- Language: English
- Subject: Behavioural sciences; Social science
- Published: 2001 (1st edition), 2015 (2nd)
- Publication place: United States
- Media type: Print, e-book
- Pages: 16,695
- ISBN: 9780080430768
- OCLC: 47869490
- LC Class: H41 .I58 2001 Alc

The International Encyclopedia of the Social & Behavioral Sciences, originally edited by Neil J. Smelser and Paul B. Baltes, is a 26-volume work published by Elsevier. It has some 4,000 signed articles (commissioned by around 50 subject editors), and includes 150 biographical entries, 122,400 entries, and an extensive hierarchical subject index. It is also available in online editions. Reviewers described the work as "the largest corpus of knowledge about the social and behavioral sciences in existence." and "the atomic bomb of reference works." It was first published in 2001, with a 2nd edition published in 2015. The second edition is edited by James D. Wright.

== Subject Classification ==
Contents include the following broad Subject Classification.

Overarching Topics: Institutions and infrastructure, History of the social sciences and the behavioral sciences, Ethics of research and applications, Biographies, Integrative concepts and issues

Methodology: Statistics, Mathematics and computer sciences, Logic of inquiry and research design.

Disciplines: Anthropology, Demography, Economics, Education, History, Linguistics. Philosophy, Political science, Clinical psychology and applied psychology, Cognitive psychology and cognitive science, Developmental psychology, social psychology, personality psychology and motivational psychology, Sociology

Intersecting Fields: Evolutionary sciences, Genetics, behavior and society, Behavioral neuroscience and cognitive neuroscience, Psychiatry, Health, Gender studies, Religious studies, Expressive forms, Environmental sciences/ecological sciences, Science and technology studies, Area studies and international studies

Applications: Organizational studies and management studies, Media studies and commercial applications, Urban studies and Urban planning, Public policy, Modern cultural concerns

== Subclassification of articles with an example ==
The above Subject Classification is alphabetized with a link for each such general subject at ScienceDirect.Com. Each such link leads to subclassification links for that subject. The hierarchical classification of articles for a subject can be used to locate an article. For example, the Economics link above brings up these subclassification links:

- Agricultural and Natural Resource Economics
- Financial Economics
- General Methods and Schools
- Industrial Organization and Law and Economics
- International Economics, Growth, and Development
- Labor Economics
- Public and Welfare Economics

Each such subclassification link goes to corresponding Encyclopedia article titles with the author, page numbers, and links to the article Abstract and a View of Related Articles. (The latter is an extensive list of references separate from the Bibliography in the article.) For example, under the Economics link above, the link for "General Methods and Schools" brings up:

- Auctions, Pages 917–923, S. Müller | Abstract | View Related Articles
- Behavioral Economics, Pages 1094–1100, S. Mullainathan and R. H. Thaler ...
- Consumer Economics, Pages 2669–2674, A. P. Barten
- Econometric Software, Pages 4058–4065, W. H. Greene
- Econometrics, History of, Pages 4065–4069, M. S. Morgan and D. Qin
- Economic Education, Pages 4078–4084, W. E. Becker
- Economics and Ethics, Pages 4146–4152, J. Broome
- Economics, History of, Pages 4152–4158, M. Schabas
- Economics, Philosophy of, Pages 4159–4165, D. M. Hausman
- Economics: Overview, Pages 4158–4159, O. Ashenfelter
- Expectations, Economics of, Pages 5060–5067, G. W. Evans and S. Honkapohja
- Experimental Economics, Pages 5100–5108, V. L. Smith
- Feminist Economics, Pages 5451–5457, D. Meulders
- Firm Behavior, Pages 5676–5681, F. M. Scherer
- Game Theory: Noncooperative Games, Pages 5873–5880, E. van Damme
- Information, Economics of, Pages 7480–7486, S. S. Lippman and J. J. McCall
- Institutional Economic Thought, Pages 7543–7550, G. M. Hodgson
- Macroeconomic Data, Pages 9111–9117, T. P. Hill
- Market Areas, Pages 9203–9207, J.-C. Thill
- Marxian Economic Thought, Pages 9286–9292, R. Bellofiore
- Monetary Policy, Pages 9976–9984, B. M. Friedman
- Political Economy, History of, Pages 11649–11653, K. Tribe
- Post-Keynesian Thought, Pages 11849–11856, G. C. Harcourt
- Psychiatric Care, Economics of, Pages 12267–12272, S. Tyutyulkova and S. S. Sharfstein
- Psychology and Economics, Pages 12390–12396, K. Fiedler and M. Wänke
- Science, Economics of, Pages 13664–13668, W. E. Steinmueller
- Search, Economics of, Pages 13760–13768, C. A. Pissarides
- Transaction Costs and Property Rights, Pages 15840–15845, O. E. Williamson

The abstract for each article can be linked from the article link. An example of an Abstract link is that for the article "Economics: Overview" above.

== See also ==
- Economics handbooks
- List of encyclopedias by branch of knowledge
- International Encyclopedia of the Social Sciences (1968)
- The New Palgrave: A Dictionary of Economics (1987)
- The New Palgrave Dictionary of Economics, 2nd Edition (2008)
