= Neil Smelser =

American sociologist (1930–2017)

- Born: Neil Joseph Smelser; July 22, 1930; Kahoka, Missouri, US
- Died: October 2, 2017 (aged 87); Berkeley, California, US

Academic background
- Education: Harvard University (BA 1952; PhD 1958); Magdalen College, Oxford (BA 1954); San Francisco Psychoanalytic Institute (1971)
- Thesis: Social Change in the Industrial Revolution
- Academic advisor: Talcott Parsons

Academic work
- Discipline: Sociology
- Sub-discipline: Economic sociology; political sociology
- Institutions: University of California, Berkeley (1958–1994); Center for Advanced Study in the Behavioral Sciences (1994–2001)
- Notable students: Jeffrey C. Alexander; Simon Frith; Arlie Russell Hochschild; Gary T. Marx; Christine Williams

Neil Joseph Smelser (July 22, 1930 – October 2, 2017) was an American sociologist who served as professor of sociology at the University of California, Berkeley. His research was on collective behavior, sociological theory, economic sociology, sociology of education, social change, and comparative methods.

== Early life and education ==
Neil Joseph Smelser was born in Kahoka, Missouri, on July 22, 1930. His parents moved to Phoenix, Arizona six weeks later, and he attended Phoenix public schools through high school. Both of his parents were teachers: his father taught philosophy and drama at Glendale Community College and his mother taught high school Latin. His father was politically active on the left, particularly in the local American Federation of Teachers union.

Smelser next attended Harvard University on a national scholarship, where he graduated in 1952 with a Bachelor of Arts degree from the Department of Social Relations. He wrote an undergraduate honors thesis under the mentorship of social psychologist Gardner Lindzey, who would remain a mentor, close friend, and professional resource for decades to come. From 1952 to 1954, he was a Rhodes scholar at Magdalen College, Oxford, where he studied philosophy, politics, and economics, rowed crew, and married just after his exams; there he was awarded a second Bachelor of Arts degree in 1954.

He returned to Harvard in September 1954 for graduate work and became a junior fellow of the Harvard Society of Fellows the next year, in the summer of 1955. During his first year of graduate school he co-authored Economy and Society with Talcott Parsons, first published in 1956. He earned his Doctor of Philosophy degree in sociology from Harvard in 1958. His doctoral dissertation was later published as Social Change in the Industrial Revolution in 1959.

Later in life he studied psychoanalysis at the San Francisco Psychoanalytic Institute, where he began his training in 1963 and graduated in 1971.

== Career ==
Smelser joined the University of California, Berkeley in 1958 after graduating from Harvard and was given tenure just a year after. In 1962 he was made full professor, and in 1972 he was raised to University Professor. He retired emeritus in 1994, but remained active in campus life and academic mentorship. In the year of his retirement, he was awarded a Berkeley Citation.

In the mid-1960s Free Speech Movement at Berkeley he became a leading liaison between the university administration and student groups. He became Special Assistant for Student Political Activity to the Chancellor at UC Berkeley in 1965, Assistant Chancellor for Educational Development 1966–1969, and Associate Director of the Institute of International Studies 1969–1973 and 1980–1990. He also chaired the Academic Senate Policy Committee 1971–1972 and chaired the Department of Sociology twice, 1974–1976 and 1991–1992. He assisted with the founding of Oakes College at the University of California, Santa Cruz in the 1970s, and 1989–1997 he was a high level advisor to Berkeley's management of Los Alamos National Laboratory and Lawrence Livermore National Laboratory.

He became the youngest editor of the American Sociological Review in 1961, at the age of 31. He was elected to the American Academy of Arts and Sciences in 1968, to the American Philosophical Society in 1976, and to the National Academy of Sciences in 1993. He received a Guggenheim Fellowship (1973–1974) and a Russell Sage Fellowship (1989–1990) and served on the board of trustees of the Russell Sage Foundation 1990–2000.

At Berkeley, he taught roughly 55 doctoral students in sociology, including several students who would go on to become notable sociologists themselves including Jeffrey C. Alexander, Simon Frith, Gary T. Marx, and Christine Williams. He was also a mentor to Arlie Russell Hochschild. In addition to his work in sociology, he was a practicing psychoanalyst and mentor to clinical psychoanalysts; he volunteered in that capacity at the UC Berkeley student health center.

On his retirement in 1994, the mayor of Berkeley, Jeffrey Leiter, appeared at his retirement party on May 6 to declare the day "Neil Smelser Day." After retirement, he was the fifth director of Stanford University's Center for Advanced Study in the Behavioral Sciences from 1994 to 2001 and he mentored Robert Wood Johnson postdoctoral fellows at Berkeley. He delivered the George Simmel Lectures at Humboldt University of Berlin in 1995 and UC Berkeley's Clark Kerr lectures in 2012. He served as president of the American Sociological Association in 1997. He was the 2000 Ernest W. Burgess Fellow of the American Academy of Political and Social Science, and in 2002 he was awarded the first Foundation Mattei Dogan Prize from the International Sociological Association. In the year of his death, 2017, he received the Constantine Panunzio Distinguished Emeriti Award from the University of California system.

== Personal life and death ==
Smelser was married twice. He met his first wife, Helen Margolis, as an undergraduate at Harvard and they married in the summer of 1954, just after the end of his Rhodes scholarship. They had two children. The marriage ended with separation in 1964 and then divorce in 1965. He married Sharin Hubbert in 1967, and they had two children and remained married until his death.

Smelser died in Berkeley, California on October 2, 2017. He was survived by his second wife, of 50 years, Sharin "Shina" Smelser, and by four children and several grandchildren.

== Major works ==
=== Theory of Collective Behavior ===
In Theory of Collective Behavior, Smelser offered a unified theory of collective behavior. It differs from the European social-psychological research on crowd psychology by Gustave Le Bon, Wilfred Trotter, William McDougall, and Sigmund Freud. It also breaks with the American tradition of Edward Alsworth Ross, Robert E. Park, and Herbert Blumer.

As part of his theory, Smelser used the concept of value-added as a metaphor to describe how collective actions occur. Smelser's value added theory (or strain theory) argued that six elements were necessary for a particular kind of collective behavior to emerge:

- Structural conduciveness - things that make or allow certain behaviors possible (e.g. spatial proximity)
- Structural strain - something (inequality, injustice) must strain society
- Generalized belief - explanation; participants have to come to an understanding of what the problem is
- Precipitating factors - spark to ignite the flame
- Mobilization for action - people need to become organized
- Failure of social control - how the authorities react (or don't)

=== Economic sociology ===
Smelser was a proponent of economic sociology, an interdisciplinary field that links sociology and economics.

In The Sociology of Economic Life (1963), Smelser defined the field of economic sociology "as the sociological perspective applied to economic phenomena." Smelser contrasted economic sociology to mainstream economics in terms of (1) their concept of the actor, (2) their concept of economic action, (3) their sense of constraints on Economic Action, (4) their view of the relationship between the economy and society, (5) their goals of analysis, (6) the models they employ, and (7) their intellectual tradition.

Smelser and Richard Swedberg's edited volume The Handbook of Economic Sociology (1994; 2nd edition in 2005) was credited with "consolidat[ing] the field of economic sociology."

=== The comparative method ===
Smelser wrote important early works on the comparative method in the social sciences. In Comparative Methods in the Social Sciences (1976), Smelser showed how classic studies of Alexis de Tocqueville, Émile Durkheim, and Max Weber relied on the comparative method.

Smelser's work on the comparative method influenced a key text on the comparative method by Arend Lijphart.

== Publications ==
- Parsons, Talcott, and Neil J. Smelser. 1956. Economy and Society: A Study in the Integration of Economic and Social Theory. London: Routledge.
- Smelser, Neil J. 1959. Social Change in the Industrial Revolution: An Application of Theory to the British Cotton Industry. Chicago: University of Chicago Press.
- Smelser, Neil J. 1962. Theory of Collective Behavior. New York: Free Press.
- Smelser, Neil J. 1963. The Sociology of Economic Life. Englewood Cliffs, N.J., Prentice-Hall.
- Smelser, Neil J. 1968. Essays in Sociological Explanation. Englewood Cliffs, N.J., Prentice-Hall.
- Smelser, Neil J. 1976. Comparative Methods in the Social Sciences. Englewood Cliffs, N.J., Prentice-Hall.
- Smelser, Neil J. (ed.). 1988. Handbook of sociology. Newbury Park, Calif.: Sage Publications.
- Smelser, Neil J. 1991. Social Paralysis and Social Change: British Working-Class Education in the Nineteenth Century. Berkeley, CA: University of California Press.
- Smelser, Neil J., and Richard Swedberg. (eds.). 1994. The Handbook of Economic Sociology. Princeton, NJ: Princeton University Press.
- Smelser, Neil J. 1998. The Social Edges of Psychoanalysis. Berkeley, CA: University of California Press.
- Smelser, Neil J. 1998. "The Rational and the Ambivalent in the Social Sciences: 1997 Presidential Address". American Sociological Review Vol. 63, No. 1: 1-16.
- Smelser, Neil J., and Paul B. Baltes (eds.). 2001. International Encyclopedia of the Social & Behavioral Sciences, 26 volumes. Amsterdam, Netherlands: Elsevier.
- Smelser, Neil J., and Richard Swedberg. (eds.). 2005. The Handbook of Economic Sociology, Second Edition. Princeton, NJ: Princeton University Press.
- Smelser, Neil J. 2013. Dynamics of the Contemporary University: Growth, Accretion, and Conflict. Berkeley, CA: University of California Press.
- Smelser, Neil J. 2014. Getting Sociology Right: A Half-Century of Reflections. Berkeley, CA: University of California Press.

== Resources on Smelser and his research ==
- King, Judson, Victoria Bonnell, and Michael Burawoy. 2017. "In Memoriam. Neil Joseph Smelser. University Professor. Professor of Sociology, Emeritus. UC Berkeley, 1930-2017".
- Ormrod, James S. 2014. "Smelser’s Theory of Collective Behaviour", pp. 184–99, in James S. Ormrod, Fantasy and Social Movements. New York, NY: Palgrave Macmillan.
- Smelser, Neil J. 2011-2012. "Neil Smelser: Distinguished Sociologist, University Professor and Servant to the Public." Interviews conducted by Jess McIntosh and Lisa Rubens in 2011-2012.
- Social Science Space. 2017. "The Constant Diplomat: Neil Smelser, 1930-2017."
- Sullivan, T.J., Thompson, K.S. (1986), "Collective Behaviour and Social Change" in Sociology: Concepts, Issues and Applications, Chapter 12. MacMillan, New York.
- Swedberg, Richard, 1990. Economics and Sociology: Redefining Their Boundaries: Conversations with Economists and Sociologists. Princeton; Chapter 11 on Neil Smelser.
