= Discrimination in the United States =

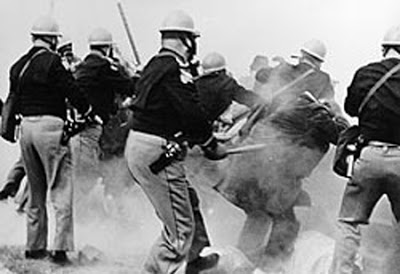
Multiple officers engage in police brutality outside Selma, Alabama, on March 7, 1965, against demonstrators protesting racial segregation.

Discrimination comprises "base or the basis of class or category without regard to individual merit, especially to show prejudice on the basis of ethnicity, gender, or a similar social factor". This term is used to highlight the difference in treatment between members of different groups when one group is intentionally singled out and treated worse, or not given the same opportunities. Attitudes toward minorities have been marked by discrimination in the history of the United States. Many forms of discrimination have come to be recognized in American society, particularly on the basis of national origin, race and ethnicity, non-English languages, religion, gender, and sexual orientation.

== History ==
=== Racism ===
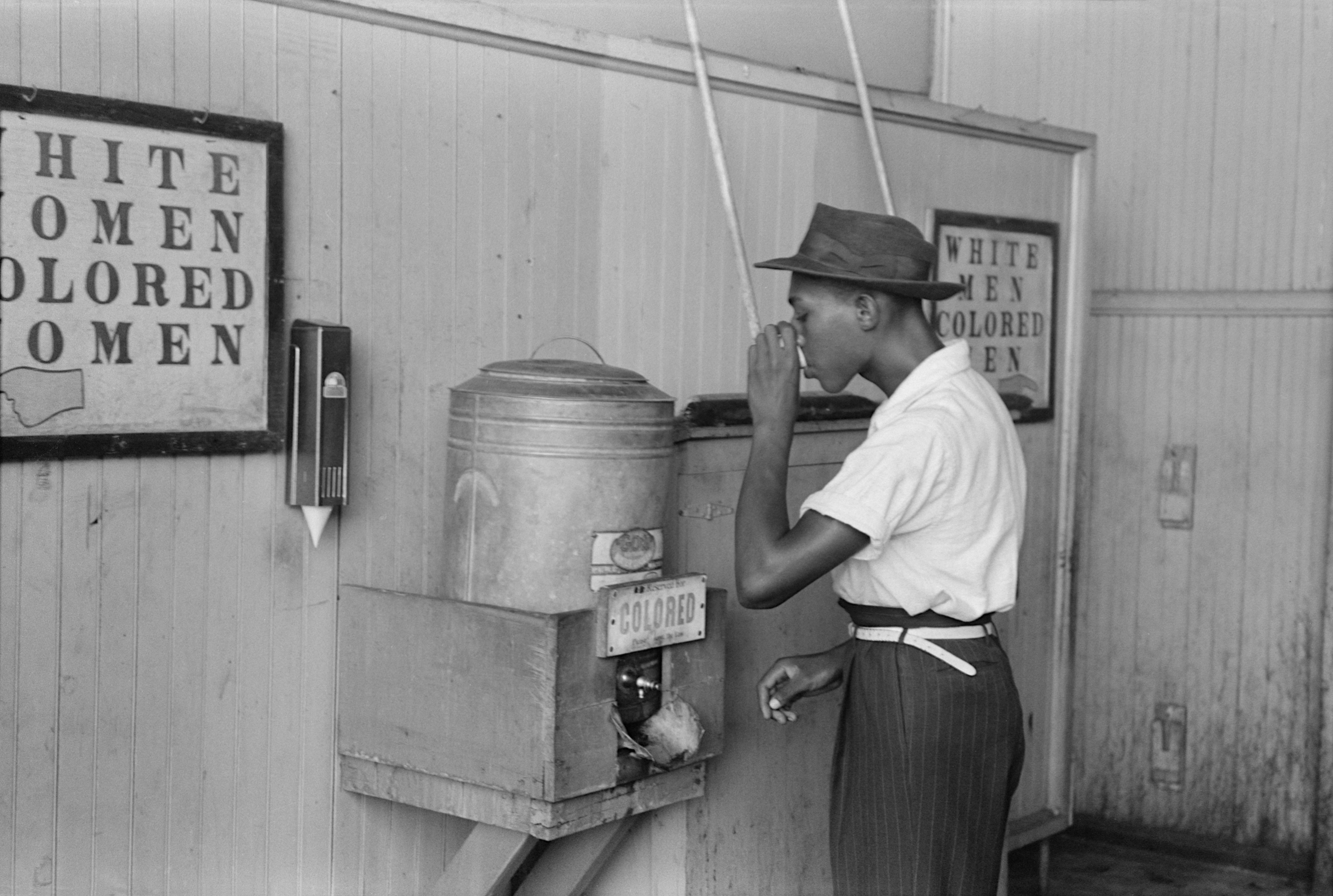
Picture showing that most public places were segregated in the United States.

Colorism is a form of racially-based discrimination where people are treated unequally due to skin color. It initially came about in the United States during slavery. Lighter skinned slaves tended to work indoors, while dark skinned worked outdoors. In 1865, during the Reconstruction period after the American Civil War, the Thirteenth Amendment to the United States Constitution was passed and it abolished slavery. This was soon followed by the Fourteenth Amendment to the United States Constitution that granted citizenship to all persons "born or naturalized in the United States", and the Fifteenth Amendment to the United States Constitution that protected the rights to vote for everyone. These Amendments passed during the Reconstruction period extended protection to the newly emancipated slaves. However, in the 1870s Jim Crow laws were introduced in the Southeastern United States. These laws promoted the idea of "Separate but equal" which was first brought about from the Plessy v. Ferguson decision in 1896, meaning that all races were equal, but they had to have separate public facilities. The mixing of races was illegal in most places such as public schools, public transportation and restaurants. These laws increased discrimination and segregation in the United States. Oftentimes, the products and sections designated for the "Colored" were inferior and not as nice for the "White Only" in fact Jim Crow represented the legitimization of anti-black racism. Water fountains, bathrooms, and park benches were just a few of the areas segregated by Caucasians due to Jim Crow laws. Furthermore, the Jim Crow laws systematically made life harder for African-Americans and other people of color. It made voting harder to accomplish, due to the fact that African-Americans had to take literacy tests and go through other obstacles before they would get the chance to vote.

In the modern United States, Racial injustice and discrimination are not only present, they are also pressing. Gay black men are extremely likely to experience intersectional discrimination. In the United States, the children of gay African-American men have a poverty rate of 52 percent, the highest in the country. Gay African-American men in partnerships are also six times more likely to live in poverty than gay white male couples.

Some researchers have made the controversial claim that the racist treatment of African-Americans amounts to genocide, elaborated on in Black genocide in the United States with foci on slavery, Jim Crow, and other racist institutions in the U.S.

In August 2020, the U.S. Justice Department argued that Yale University discriminated against Asian candidates on the basis of their race, a charge the university denied.

=== Fighting back ===
Major figures such as Martin Luther King Jr., Malcolm X, and Rosa Parks were involved in the fight against the race-based discrimination of the Civil Rights Movement. Rosa Parks's refusal to give up her bus seat in 1955 sparked the Montgomery bus boycott—a large movement in Montgomery, Alabama, that was an integral period at the beginning of the Civil Rights Movement. The Bus Boycott lasted a total of 381 days before the Supreme Court of the United States deemed that segregated seating is unconstitutional. Dr. Martin Luther King Jr., a peaceful activist and a pastor, led many such protests, advocating improvements in the lives of African-Americans in American society. His role in the Montgomery Bus Boycott helped to launch his role in the Civil Rights Movement. King organized many protests which were not only attended by African-Americans, they were also attended by Caucasians.

While King organized peaceful protests, Malcolm X went on a different route. Along with his main supporters, The Nation of Islam, he advocated a belief in black power, and black pride. Although Malcolm X's actions were radical, especially when they contradicted the actions of Dr. King, he is still considered one of the pioneers who led the fight against racial discrimination in daily life and he is not considered an anti-racism pioneer from a solely political perspective. His advocacy of black nationalism and his advocacy of the use of violence in response to racial discrimination sparked the founding of the political group the Black Panther Party for Self-Defense, which later became known as the Black Panther Party. Formed by Bobby Seale and Huey P. Newton, the organization was founded in October 1966, in Oakland, California. Usually seen in nothing but black clothing and armed, as a group, the Black Panthers first started off by patrolling Oakland Police Department activity, but they soon acquired widespread support in cities like Los Angeles, and Chicago. Although they were seen as a violent gang which posed a danger to society, the Black Panthers provided numerous social programs such as free breakfast for school children and free clinics across numerous cities. What the Black Panthers were fighting for was outlined in their Ten-Point Program. They were ultimately taken down by the FBI, led by J. Edgar Hoover, in the early 1970s. Other factors such as internal tensions, and financial struggles also played into the demise of the Black Panther Party and by 1982 they were completely gone.

In the education system, the Civil Rights Movement also became huge after the ruling of Brown v. Board of Education in 1954. Oliver Brown challenged the Board of Education of Topeka, Kansas, when his daughter was not allowed to enroll in any of the all white schools by claiming that "separate but equal" violates the protection clause of the Fourteenth Amendment. Ruby Bridges, along with the Little Rock Nine, dealt with discrimination by Caucasian peers, their parents, and the community in general during the desegregation of schools. The Little Rock Nine were a group of nine African-American students who volunteered to attend school at the Central High School in Little Rock, Arkansas. They continuously had problems with the public and faced harsh treatment from other students, parents, and even the Little Rock National Guard. However, a change occurred when President Dwight D. Eisenhower intervened by sending federal troops to escort the students. For Ruby Bridges, she joined the Civil Rights Movement in the November 14, 1960, when she became enrolled in William Frantz Elementary School. Due to many parents not allowing their children in her class, Bridges was in class by herself, which was taught by Barbara Henry, and oftentimes ate alone and had recess alone. Ruby, along with her family, did face a lot of backlash throughout Louisiana from the desegregation; however, they did receive support from numerous people in the North and Bridges was able to finish the year.

== Society ==
=== Gender discrimination ===
Gender discrimination is another form of discrimination. Women are often seen as an expense to their employers because they take days off for children, need time off for maternity leave and may be stereotyped as "more emotional". It is known as the glass escalator or the glass ceiling, which holds that while women are being held down in male-dominated professions, men often rise quickly to positions of authority in certain fields. Men are being pushed forward into management, even surpassing women who have been at the job longer and have more experience in the field in some cases.

Discrimination against men has been described in the areas of family law, such as divorce and child custody, labor such as paternity leave, paternity fraud, health, education, conscription, and other areas of the law such as domestic violence, genital integrity, and allegations of rape.

=== Discrimination against immigrants ===
"Stopping" people
you have nothing in common with

And if you don't stop people that you've never seen before, that you have nothing in common with, your country is going to fail. ... This double-tailed monster [of green energy and immigration] destroys everything in its wake, and they cannot let that happen any longer. You're doing it because you want to be nice, you want to be politically correct, and you're destroying your heritage.

— President Donald Trump
to the UN General Assembly,
September 23, 2025

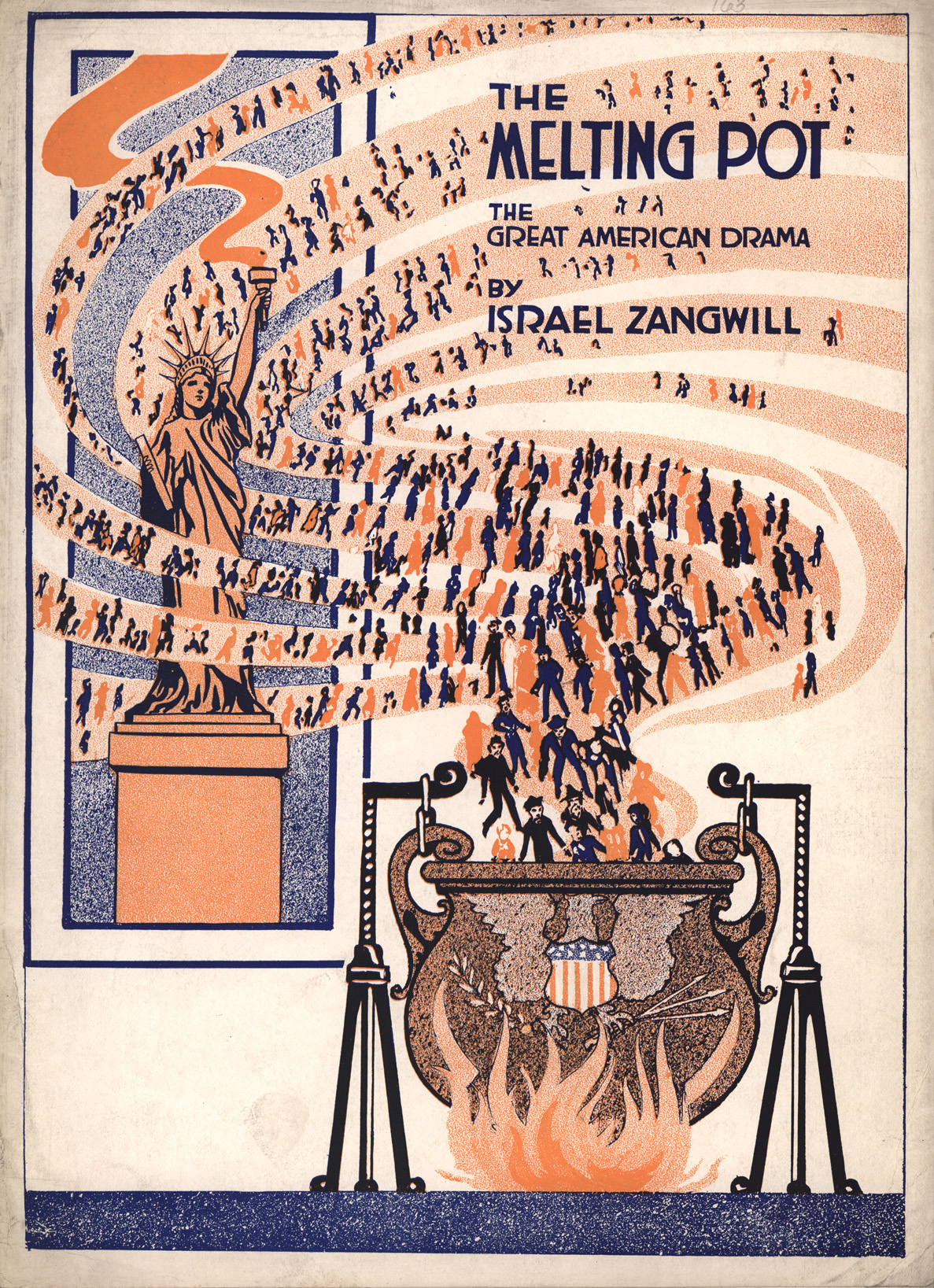

Immigrants to the United States are affected by a totally separate type of discrimination. Some people feel as though the large numbers of people being allowed into the country are cause for alarm, therefore discriminate against them.

Arizona passed a law that forces people to carry documents with them at all times to prove their citizenship. Some people claim that immigrants are taking up "Americans" jobs. Immigration restrictions are among the biggest government interventions in the economy. They prevent millions of immigrants from taking jobs, renting homes, and pursuing a wide range of opportunities that they could otherwise have. Violent hate crimes have increased drastically. Recent social psychological research suggests that this form of prejudice against migrants may be partly explained by some fairly basic cognitive processes.

According to Soylu, some argue that immigrants constantly face being discriminated against because of the color of their skin, the sound of their voice, the way they look and their beliefs. Many immigrants are well educated, some argue that they are often blamed and persecuted for the ills in society such as overcrowding of schools, disease and unwanted changes in the host country's culture due to the beliefs of this "unwelcomed" group of people.

According to Soylu, there was an open immigration policy up until 1924 in America until the National Origins Act came into effect. According to the Immigration Act of 1924 which is a United States federal law, it limited the annual number of immigrants who could be admitted from any country to 2% of the number of people from that country who were already living in the United States in 1890, down from the 3% cap set by the Immigration Restriction Act of 1921, according to the Census of 1890 It superseded the 1921 Emergency Quota Act. The law was primarily aimed at further restricting immigration of Southern Europeans and Eastern Europeans. According to Buchanan, later in the 1930s with the advent of opinion polling, immigration policy analysis was carried out by collecting public thoughts and opinions on the issue. These factors encouraged a heated debate on immigration policy. These debates continued even into the 2000s, and were intensified by George W. Bush's immigration proposal. Some argue that the 9/11 terrorist attacks left the country in a state of paranoia and fear that strengthened the views in favor of having closed borders.

==== Discrimination in the workplace ====
Immigration to the United States can be difficult due to immigrants' lack of access to legal documents and the expensive nature of immigration. The United States has historically been a major target destination for people seeking work and continues to be so today.. As Graciela, a 47-year-old married woman who had lived in the U.S. for 4 years, stated, “My husband,... he lost his job. Things were beginning to get tough... We came with the need to find work and better life possibilities.” Worldwide, the workforce has become increasingly pluralistic and ethnically diverse as more and more people migrate across nations. Although race- or ethnicity-based discriminatory employment practices are prohibited in most developed countries, according to feminist scholar Mary Harcourt, actual discrimination is still widespread. Sahagian Jacqueline, an author, argues that one example of this act of discrimination occurred at Macy's a department store. According to the U.S. Justice Department, Macy's used unfair documentation practices against legal immigrant employees who had proper work authorizations. During an eligibility re-verification process, Macy's broke immigration law that prohibits employers from discriminating against immigrant employees during re-verification by asking for more or different documents than other employees are required to submit based on a worker's immigration status or national origin. Some of the affected employees lost seniority, were suspended, or even let go due to the illegal re-verification. While their opinions are controversial, researchers Moran, Tyler and Daranee argue that with immigrants' growing numbers and their expanding economic role in U.S. society, addressing challenges and creating opportunities for immigrants to succeed in the labor force are critical prerequisites to improve the economic security for all low-wage working families and ensure the future vitality of our economy.

=== Discrimination based on sexual orientation ===
Another type of discrimination is that against lesbian, gay, bisexual, transgender, and queer (LGBTQ+) individuals. For personal reasons such as religious beliefs, employers sometimes choose to not hire LGBTQ+ people. Late in 1979, a new religious revival among conservative Evangelical Protestants and Roman Catholics ushered in the Republican coalition politically aligned with the Christian right that would reign in the United States between the years 1970s and 1980s, becoming another obstacle for the progress of the LGBTQ+ rights movement. During the HIV/AIDS epidemic of the 1980s, LGBTQ+ communities were further stigmatized as they became the focus of mass hysteria, suffered isolation and marginalization, and were targeted with extreme acts of violence.

LGBTQ+ people and their rights have been discriminated against for various reasons; for example, one topic of controversy related to LGBTQ+ people is same-sex marriage, which was legalized in all the fifty states in June 2015 following the Supreme Court case Obergefell v. Hodges. On 15 June 2020, the Supreme Court ruled in Bostock v. Clayton County and two other cases, that workplace discrimination based on sexual orientation or gender identity is covered by Title VII of the Civil Rights Act of 1964.

=== Changes in Diversity and Equity Policies ===
Revocation of Diversity, Equity, and Inclusion (DEI) Initiatives: In January 2025, President Donald Trump signed an executive order canceling DEI programs within the federal government. This decision includes eliminating DEI-related positions in federal agencies within 60 days.

=== Discrimination in the Education System ===
Ban on Racial Quotas in University Admissions: In June 2023, the U.S. Supreme Court ruled that considering race as a factor in university admissions is unconstitutional. This decision could lead to the end of affirmative action policies that had been in place at many American universities for 50 years.

=== Global Concerns About Racial Discrimination ===
Increasing Concerns About Racial Discrimination in the U.S.:

A study by the Pew Research Center found that an average of 89% of individuals across 16 non-U.S. countries described racial and ethnic discrimination in the United States as a "somewhat" or "very serious" problem.

=== Political discrimination ===
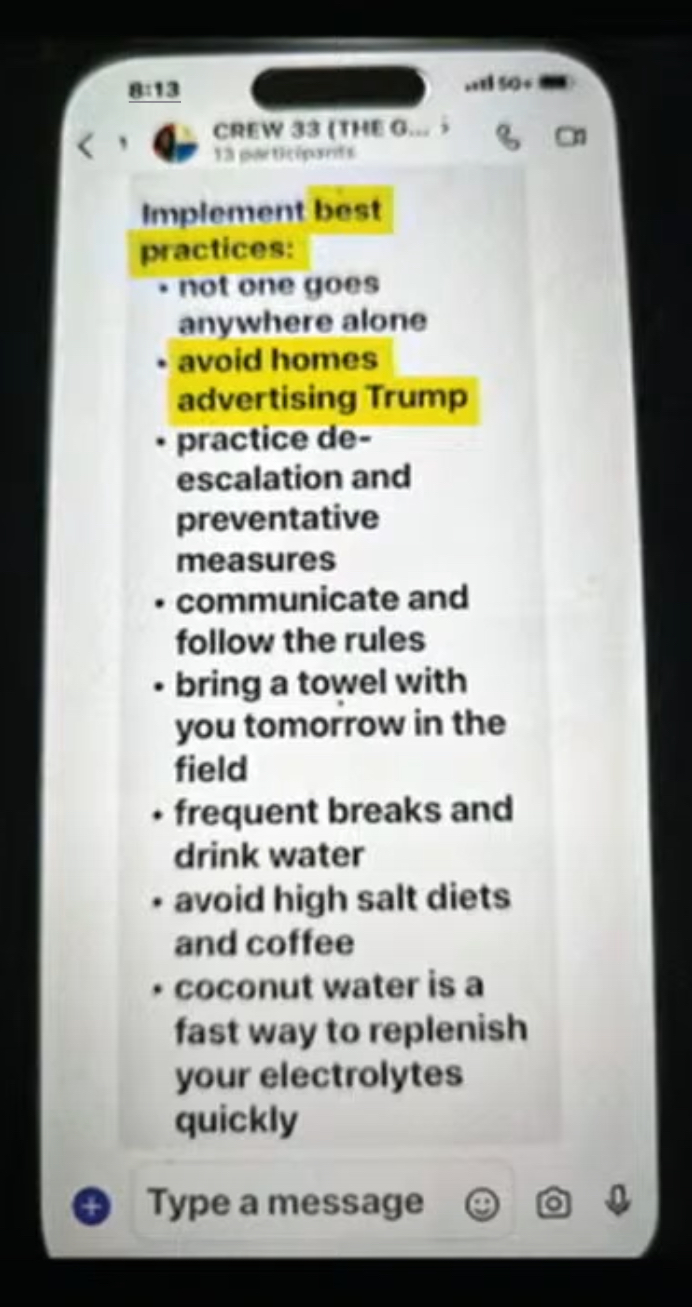
Verified orders from FEMA, presented during the hearing, to avoid providing aid to supporters of President Trump

Between November 2024–March 2025, the United States Congress held four separate televised investigative hearings on the federal government's response to, overall recovery efforts from, and criminal events following Hurricane Helene and Hurricane Milton during the 2024 Atlantic hurricane season. These hearings heavily focused on actions done by the Federal Emergency Management Agency (FEMA), including failures in FEMA's response as well as political discrimination and criminal actions by FEMA employees.

FEMA came under criticism in early November, when a whistleblower's report revealed that FEMA supervisor Marn'i Washington instructed team members that it was "best practice" to skip Trump-supporting homes as they canvassed Florida neighborhoods, determining who needed assistance following the hurricane. FEMA workers skipped at least 20 homes in Lake Placid with Trump signs or flags. FEMA responded by stating it was "deeply disturbed by this employee's actions" and claimed that the agency works to "help all survivors regardless of their political preference or affiliation." Washington was fired for her actions. Following a state investigation of the matter, Florida Attorney General Ashley Moody filed a discrimination lawsuit on November 14 against FEMA for conspiring to violate the civil rights of Florida residents in the response to Hurricanes Helene and Milton.

== See also ==
- Ableism#United States
- Age discrimination in the United States
- Anti-Asian racism#United States
- Anti-Catholicism#United States
  - Anti-Catholicism in the United States
- Anti-Christian Sentiment
- Antisemitism
  - Antisemitism by country#United States
    - Antisemitism in the United States
      - History of antisemitism#United States
        - History of antisemitism in the United States
- Black flight
- Civil and political rights
- Civil union
- Employment discrimination in the United States
- History of civil rights in the United States
- History of slavery in the United States
- Homophobia in hip hop culture
- Housing discrimination in the United States
- Housing segregation
- Human rights in the United States
- Islamophobia
  - Islamophobia in the United States
- Maid narratives
- Mortgage discrimination
- Political violence in the United States
- Radicalism in the United States
- Radical right (United States)
- Terrorism in the United States
- Domestic terrorism in the United States
- Project SCUM
- Race and crime in the United States
- Racial inequality in the United States
- Racial steering
- Religious discrimination in the United States
- Tobacco marketing targeting African Americans
- White backlash#United States
- White flight#United States
- Racism against African Americans
- Racism against Native Americans in the United States
- LGBT employment discrimination in the United States
