= Gary T. Marx =

American sociologist (born 1938)

Gary T. Marx (born October 1, 1938) is an American sociologist known especially for his work on race and ethnicity. He is professor of sociology emeritus at the Massachusetts Institute of Technology (MIT), where he taught 1973–1994, and the University of Colorado Boulder, where he was head of the sociology department 1992–1996. He has worked in the areas of race and ethnicity, collective behavior and social movements, law and society and surveillance studies.

== Early life and education ==
Marx was born on October 1, 1938 on a farm near Hanford in central California. He was raised in Los Angeles from the age of two and attended John Marshall High School. He has degrees from UCLA (1960) and the University of California, Berkeley (PhD in sociology, 1966: Protest and Prejudice: The Climate of Opinion in the Negro American Community). At Berkeley, he was a student of Neil Smelser and also mentored by Erving Goffman, Charles Y. Glock, and Seymour Martin Lipset.

== Career ==
Marx taught at Harvard University in the Department of Social Relations, next moving to the Massachusetts Institute of Technology in Urban Studies and Planning (1973–1994). From 1992, he spent four years as head of the Sociology Department at the University of Colorado at Boulder.

Marx's early work was on race relations in the United States, during the Civil Rights Movement. He has also contributed to studies of collective behavior and social movements, and studies of policing and policing methods. In 1967, he was a consultant sociologist for the National Advisory Commission on Civil Disorders (the Kerner Commission) and participated in the writing of the controversial internal staff paper, "The Harvest of American Racism," which concluded that some of 1967's rioting was political in nature and inferred that it was justified. Although this paper was largely rejected by senior staff, its major theme—that the rioting was caused by racism—was consistent with that of the commission's final report, and Marx, while recognizing some of the final report's weaknesses, has generally been a strong and consistent supporter of the report.

He worked extensively on surveillance issues, illustrating how and why surveillance is neither good nor bad, but context and comportment make it so. He has sought to create a conceptual map of new ways of collecting, analyzing, communicating and using personal information. Explanation and evaluation require a common language for the identification and measurement of surveillance's fundamental properties and contexts (e.g., the new surveillance, surveillance society, maximum security society, surveillance creep; surveillance slack, the softening of surveillance, the myth of surveillance, neutralization and counter-neutralization, and four basic surveillance contexts: coercion, contracts, care, and cross cutting, unprotected "publicly" available data).

His work has appeared or been reprinted in over 300 books, monographs and periodicals and has been translated into Japanese, Chinese, Czech, French, Italian, Spanish, Hebrew, Dutch, German, Russian, Polish, Hungarian, Greek, Turkish, Portuguese, Persian, Macedonian, Slovak, Swedish, Belarusian; and other languages.

Marx has been a consultant to, or served on panels, for the House Committee on the Judiciary, the House Science Committee, the Senate Labor and Human Resources Committee, the Government Accountability Office, the Office of Technology Assessment, the Justice Department, and other federal agencies; various state and local governments; the European Community and European Parliament, the House of Commons of Canada, The National Academy of Sciences, the Social Science Research Council, the American Association for the Advancement of Science, the U.K. Association of Chief Police Officers, public interest groups, foundations and think tanks.

== Personal life ==
Marx was married with children, to Phyllis Anne Rakita Marx for over 50 years until her death in 2013. They moved to a farm on Bainbridge Island near Seattle in 1996.

== Awards ==
- Guggenheim Fellowship (1970)
- Fellow, Center for Advanced Study in the Behavioral Sciences (1987–88; 1996–97)
- Fellow, Woodrow Wilson International Center for Scholars (1997–98)
- Outstanding Book Award for Undercover from the Academy of Criminal Justice Sciences (1990)
- Doctor Honoris Causa from the Vrije Universiteit Brussel (2017)
- Lifetime Achievement Award from the Crime and Juvenile Delinquency Division of the Society for the Study of Social Problems (2011)
- Goffman Award for Outstanding Scholarship in the Ecology of Social Interaction from the Media Ecology Association (2017)
- George Herbert Mead Award for Lifetime Achievement from the Society for the Study of Symbolic Interaction (2019).

== Major works ==
- Protest and Prejudice: a Study of Belief in the Black Community (Harper & Row, 1967)
- Racial Conflict, Tension and Change in American Society (Little, Brown & Co., 1971)
- Muckracking Sociology: Research as Social Criticism. (Ed. Transaction Publishers, 1972)
- Society Today.(with Norman Goodman, Random House, 1978)
- Sociology: Classic and popular approaches (with Norman Goodman, Random House, 1980)
- Undercover: Police Surveillance in America (University of California Press, 1989)
- Collective Behavior and Social Movements (with Doug McAdam, Pearson, 1993)
- Undercover Police Surveillance in Comparative Perspective (ed. with Cyrille Fijnaut, Brill, 1995)
- Windows Into the Soul: Surveillance and Society in an Age of High Technology (University of Chicago Press, 2016) (CHOICE Outstanding Academic Title Award 2017)

== Selected newspaper articles, letters, and op-eds ==
- "The Cost of Virtue" New York Times, June 29, 1980.
- "Police Spying Must Be Controlled" Los Angeles Times, April 12, 1983.
- "Defects in Government's Entrapment Standard" New York Times, August 28, 1984.
- "We're All Under Surveillance" Los Angeles Times, December 1, 1985.
- "Boston's Example on Racial Harassment (with Chuck Wexler) Christian Science Monitor, January 14, 1986.
- "Drug Foes Aren't High on Civil Liberties" New York Times, February 24, 1986.
- "When a Child Informs on Parents" New York Times, August 29, 1986.
- "The Company is Watching You Everywhere" New York Times, February 15, 1987.
- "Raising Your Hand Just Won't Do" Los Angeles Times, April 1, 1987.
- "Make Sure the Video Camera Doesn't Lie" Newsday, October 23, 1988.
- "You'd Better Watch Out! This is the Year of Spying Kits for Kids" Los Angeles Times, December 25, 1988.
- "Smile: You're on Candid News" Christian Science Monitor, March 13, 1989.
- "DNA 'Fingerprints' May One Day Be Our National ID Card" Wall Street Journal, April 20, 1989.
- "When Anonymity of Caller is Lost, We're That Closer to a Surveillance Society" Los Angeles Times, May 3, 1989.
- "Dial "P" for "Privacy" in New Telephone Technology" New York Times, August 31, 1989.
- "When Doing Wrong Means Doing Right" Law Enforcement News, September 15, 1989.
- "Now the Techno-Snoopers Want to Get Into Our Genes" Los Angeles Times, September 15, 1989.
- "For Sale: Personal Information About You" Washington Post, December 11, 1989.
- "Hang Up on Caller ID" Washington Post, January 29, 1990.
- "Bosses Should Nix Job In-scent-ives" Newsday, July 6, 1990.
- "Under-the-Covers Undercover Work" Law Enforcement News, February 14, 1991.
- "Home Voice Mail Doesn't Guarantee Privacy" New York Times, August 24, 1989
- "Communication Advances Raise Privacy Concerns" Christian Science Monitor, June 2, 1992 (part of a World Media Project, "Directions in Science," appearing in 27 newspapers worldwide.)
- "Let's Eavesdrop on Managers!" Computerworld, April 20, 1992.
- "Challenges of Contemporary Parenting: Effectively Applying Drug Tests for Children" Privacy Journal, November 1998.
- "Sex, Truth and Video Tapes: The Case of the French Babysitter" Los Angeles Times, May 28, 2002.
- "Are You for Real? Police and Other Impersonators" Newsday, January 16, 2005.
- "Camerica? Two Cheers (or less) for the Indiscriminate Spread of Video Cameras in Public Areas" ID Trail Mix, Aug. 2005.
- "Who is That Masked Woman? Masking and Unmasking in Public Places" ID Trail Mix. January 2007.
- "Trade ‘ya a Sinbad for a Marauder: Drug Fighting, '90s Style" A stillborn Op-Ed article.
