= Jaap van Ginneken =

Dutch psychologist and communication scholar

Jaap van Ginneken, 2009

Jaap van Ginneken (born September 8, 1943 in Hilversum) is a Dutch psychologist and communication scholar.

== Education ==
Van Ginneken completed a bachelor's degree at the Radboud University Nijmegen, a master’s at the University of Amsterdam, followed by a brief stint at the École pratique des Hautes études en sciences sociales in Paris, and finally a Ph. D. with distinction on mass psychology and crowd psychology. He taught at various universities, ultimately as a long-time associate professor at the International School and Communication Science Department of the University of Amsterdam.

== Early Journalism ==
For most of the 1970s, he worked as a Paris-based newspaper correspondent and roving reporter on third world affairs for Dutch media, with isolated contributions to foreign newspapers such as the French Le Monde and the British The Guardian. In line with the spirit of May 1968 in France and widespread opposition to the U.S. involvement in the Vietnam war, he adhered to the unequal exchange and dependency theory, and came to sympathize with liberation movements and third world revolutions. Two of his early books then focused on the new conflicts arising from them. The rise and fall of Lin Piao (and the so-called ‘Gang of Four’) dealt with ultraleftism during the Chinese cultural revolution. The third Indochina war dealt with the subsequent confrontation between China, Vietnam and Cambodia. In the course of the early 1980s, however, Van Ginneken recognized that he had become too much of a fellow traveler, and returned to academic work in his original fields.

== Academic Work ==
This covered three themes: first the history of science, second social, political and mass psychology, third media images of other cultures. On the first theme, he published a series of studies on the history of political psychology, crowd psychology, mass psychology and social psychology. He also completed a biography of Kurt Baschwitz: a Jewish- German- Dutch pioneer of communication studies and social psychology.

The second theme concerned new approaches to mass psychology and collective behavior sociology, in line with complex adaptive systems and chaos theory in Collective behavior and public opinion – Rapid shifts, with a further Dutch title on self-organization and swarming. Some of his further Dutch books dealt with mass psychology subjects such as behavioral economics and finance, hidden persuaders, and emotional contagion in large groups. Most recently, he has published two books on strange correlates of leadership.

The third theme concerned a series of studies on media psychology, and stereotypes about cultural identity. In the international news media: with Understanding global news. In movies: with Screening difference – How Hollywood blockbusters imagine race, ethnicity and culture. As well as on the clash of civilizations, with further Dutch titles on classical comic strips, interpersonal communication and the immigration debate.

His very last study is Climate, chaos and collective behaviour – A rising fickleness. (Frontiers of globalisation series). London: Palgrave MacMillan, Fall 2022. (Also in Dutch.)

Next to his academic work, Van Ginneken always remained involved in a wide range of non-academic projects, for instance in science communication: for national events, major museums and prime-time television. In his later years, he was an independent speaker and writer, based near Nice in France. In 2020 he returned to the Netherlands, to Amersfoort.

== Bibliography ==
(English titles)

- Climate, chaos and collective behaviour – A rising fickleness.(Frontiers of globalisation series). London: Palgrave MacMillan, 2022 ISBN 9783031152368. (Also in Dutch).
- Kurt Baschwitz - A Pioneer of Communication Studies and Social Psychology. Amsterdam: Amsterdam University Press 2017. ISBN 978-94-6298-604-6 (Also in Dutch).
- The Profile of Political Leaders - Archetypes of Ascendancy. London, Palgrave MacMillan 2016. ISBN 978-3-319-29475-9
- The Psychology of Power - Temptations at the top, London, Palgrave Macmillan 2014. ISBN 978-1-137-45402-7
- Mood Contagion - Mass Psychology and Collective Behaviour Sociology in the Internet Age , The Hague, Netherlands: Eleven International Publishing 2013. ISBN 978-94-6236-085-3
- Stranger Danger and the Epidemic of Fear - On the Psychology of Recent Western Reactions to Others, The Hague, Netherlands: Eleven International Publishing 2013. ISBN 978-94-90947-903
- Screening difference – How Hollywood blockbusters imagine race, ethnicity and culture, Lanham, Maryland: Rowman & Littlefield 2007. ISBN 0-7425-5584-4
- Mass movements, Apeldoorn: Spinhuis 2007. ISBN 978-90-5589-279-2
- Collective behavior and public opinion, Mahwah, NJ: Erlbaum 2003. ISBN 0-8058-4386-8
- Understanding global news, London: Sage 1998. ISBN 0-7619-5709-X
- Crowds, psychology and politics, New York: Cambridge University Press 1992. ISBN 0-521-40418-5
- The third Indochina war, Zug, Switzerland: Inter Documentation Company 1985. (Reproduction on microfilm).
- The rise and fall of Lin Piao, Harmondsworth, UK: Pelican (Penguin) 1976. ISBN 0-14-021917-X Also New York: Discus/ Avon (Hearst) 1977. ISBN 0-380-00988-9
