= Collective behavior =

Sociological theory

Collective behavior constitutes social processes and events which do not reflect existing social structure (laws, conventions, and institutions), but which emerge in a "spontaneous" way. More broadly, it can include the behavior of cells, social animals like birds and fish, and insects including ants.

Collective behavior takes many forms but generally violates societal norms. Collective behavior can be destructive, as with riots or mob violence, silly, as with fads, or anywhere in between. Collective behavior is always driven by group dynamics, encouraging people to engage in acts they might consider unthinkable under typical social circumstances.

== Defining the field ==
The concept was introduced by Franklin Henry Giddings and employed later by Robert Park and Ernest Burgess, Herbert Blumer, Ralph H. Turner and Lewis Killian, and Neil Smelser.

Turner and Killian were the first sociologists to back their theoretical propositions with visual evidence in the form of photographs and motion pictures of collective behavior in action. Prior to that sociologists relied heavily upon eyewitness accounts, which turned out to be far less reliable than one would hope.

Turner and Killian's approach is based largely upon the arguments of Blumer, who argued that social "forces" are not really forces. The actor is active: He creates an interpretation of the acts of others, and acts on the basis of this interpretation.

== Examples ==
Some instances of collective behavior include the Los Angeles riot of 1992, the hula-hoop fad of 1958, the stock market crashes of 1929, and the "phantom gasser" episodes in the mid 1940s. The claim that such diverse episodes all belong to a single field of inquiry is a theoretical assertion, and not all sociologists would agree with it. But Blumer and Neil Smelser did agree, as did others, indicating that the formulation has satisfied some leading sociological thinkers.

=== Four forms ===
Although there are several other schema that may be used to classify forms of collective behavior the following four categories from Blumer are generally considered useful by most sociologists.

==== The crowd ====
Scholars differ about what classes of social events fall under the rubric of collective behavior. In fact, the only class of events which all authors include is crowds. Clark McPhail is one of those who treats crowds and collective behavior as synonyms. Although some consider McPhail's work overly simplistic, his important contribution is to have gone beyond the speculations of others to carry out pioneering empirical studies of crowds. He finds them to form an elaborate set of types.

The classic treatment of crowds is Gustave LeBon, The Crowd: A Study of the Popular Mind, in which the author interpreted the crowds of the French Revolution as irrational reversions to animal emotion, and inferred from this that such reversion is characteristic of crowds in general. LeBon believed that crowds somehow induced people to lose their ability to think rationally and to somehow recover this ability once they had left the crowd. He speculated, but could not explain how this might occur. Freud expressed a similar view in Group Psychology and the Analysis of the Ego. Such authors have thought that their ideas were confirmed by various kinds of crowds, one of these being the economic bubble. In Holland, during the tulip mania (1637), the prices of tulip bulbs rose to astronomical heights. An array of such crazes and other historical oddities is narrated in Charles MacKay's Extraordinary Popular Delusions and the Madness of Crowds.

At the University of Chicago, Robert Park and Herbert Blumer agreed with the speculations of LeBon and other that crowds are indeed emotional. But to them a crowd is capable of any emotion, not only the negative ones of anger and fear.

A number of authors modify the common-sense notion of the crowd to include episodes during which the participants are not assembled in one place but are dispersed over a large area. Turner and Killian refer to such episodes as diffuse crowds, examples being Billy Graham's revivals, panics about sexual perils, witch hunts and Red scares. Their expanded definition of the crowd is justified if propositions which hold true among compact crowds do so for diffuse crowds as well.

Some psychologists have claimed that there are three fundamental human emotions: fear, joy, and anger. Neil Smelser, John Lofland, and others have proposed three corresponding forms of the crowd: the panic (an expression of fear), the craze (an expression of joy), and the hostile outburst (an expression of anger). Each of the three emotions can characterize either a compact or a diffuse crowd, the result being a scheme of six types of crowds. Lofland has offered the most explicit discussion of these types.

==== The public ====
Boom distinguishes the crowd, which expresses a common emotion, from a public, which discusses a single issue. Thus, a public is not equivalent to all of the members of a society. Obviously, this is not the usual use of the word, "public." To Park and Blumer, there are as many publics as there are issues. A public comes into being when discussion of an issue begins, and ceases to be when it reaches a decision on it.

==== The mass ====
To the crowd and the public Blumer adds a third form of collective behavior, the mass. It differs from both the crowd and the public in that it is defined not by a form of interaction but by the efforts of those who use the mass media to address an audience. The first mass medium was printing.

==== The social movement ====
We change intellectual gears when we confront Blumer's final form of collective behavior, the social movement. He identifies several types of these, among which are active social movements such as the French Revolution and expressive ones such as Alcoholics Anonymous. An active movement tries to change society; an expressive one tries to change its own members.

The social movement is the form of collective behavior which satisfies least well the first definition of it which was offered at the beginning of this article. These episodes are less fluid than the other forms, and do not change as often as other forms do. Furthermore, as can be seen in the history of the labor movement and many religious sects, a social movement may begin as collective behavior but over time become firmly established as a social institution.

For this reason, social movements are often considered a separate field of sociology. The books and articles about them are far more numerous than the sum of studies of all the other forms of collective behavior put together. Social movements are considered in many Wikipedia articles, and an article on the field of social movements as a whole would be much longer than this essay.

The study of collective behavior spun its wheels for many years, but began to make progress with the appearance of Turner and Killian's "Collective Behavior" and Smelser's Theory of Collective Behavior. Both books pushed the topic of collective behavior back into the consciousness of American sociologists and both theories contributed immensely to our understanding of collective behavior. Social disturbances in the U. S. and elsewhere in the late '60s and early '70s inspired another surge of interest in crowds and social movements. These studies presented a number of challenges to the armchair sociology of earlier students of collective behavior.

== Theories developed to explain collective behavior ==
Social scientists have developed various theories to explain crowd behavior.

1. Contagion theory – according to the contagion theory as formulated by French thinker Gustave Le Bon (1841-1931), crowds exert a hypnotic influence over their members. Shielded by anonymity, large numbers of people abandon personal responsibility and surrender to the contagious emotions of the crowd. A crowd thus assumes a life of its own, stirring up emotions and driving people toward irrational, even violent action. Le Bon's theory, although one of the earliest explanations of crowd behavior, is still accepted by many people outside of sociology. However, critics argue that the "collective mind" has not been documented by systematic studies. Furthermore, although collective behavior may involve strong emotions, such feelings are not necessarily irrational. Turner and Killian argue convincingly that the "contagion" never actually occurs and that participants in collective behavior do not lose their ability to think rationally.
2. Convergence theory – whereas the contagion theory suggests that crowds cause people to act in a certain way, convergence theory states that people who want to act in a certain way come together to form crowds. Developed by Floyd Allport (1890-1979) and later expanded upon by Neal Miller (1909-2002) and John Dollard (1900-1980) as "Learning Theory", the central argument of all convergence theories is that collective behavior reveals the otherwise hidden tendencies of the individuals who take part in the episode. The theory asserts that people with similar attributes find other like-minded persons with whom they can release these underlying tendencies. People sometimes do things in a crowd that they would not have the courage to do alone - because crowds can diffuse responsibility - but the behavior itself is claimed to originate within the individuals. Crowds, in addition, can intensify a sentiment simply by creating a critical mass of like-minded people.
3. Emergent-norm theory – according to sociologists Ralph Turner (1919-2014) and Lewis Killian, crowds begin as collectivities composed of people with mixed interests and motives. Especially in the case of less-stable crowds — expressive, acting and protest crowds — norms may be vague and changing, as when one person decides to break the glass windows of a store and others join in and begin looting merchandise. When people find themselves in a situation that is vague, ambiguous, or confusing, new norms "emerge" on the spot and people follow those emergent norms, which may be at odds with normal social behavior. Turner and Killian further argue that there are several different categories of participants, all of whom follow different patterns of behavior due to their differing motivations.
4. Value-added theory – Professor Neil Smelser (1930-2017) argues that collective behavior is actually a sort of release-valve for built-up tension ("strain") within a social system, community, or group. If the proper determinants are present then collective behavior becomes inevitable. Conversely, if any of the key determinants are not present no collective behavior will occur unless and until the missing determinants fall into place. These are primarily social, although physical factors such as location and weather may also contribute to or hinder the development of collective behavior.
5. Complex Adaptive Systems theory – Dutch scholar Jaap van Ginneken (1943- ) claims that contagion, convergence and emergent norms are just instances of the synergy, emergence and autopoiesis or self-creation of patterns and new entities typical for the newly discovered meta-category of complex adaptive systems. This also helps explain the key role of salient details and path-dependence in rapid shifts.
6. Shared intentionality theory – Cognitive psychologist Professor Michael Tomasello (1950- ) developed the psychological construct of shared intentionality through his insights into cognition evolution and, specifically, the knowledge development about the contribution of shared intentionality to the formation of a social reality. Shared intentionality provides unaware processes in mother-child dyads during social learning when young organisms can only manifest simple reflexes. It increases the cognitive performance of children indwelling with mothers who know the correct answer. This interaction proceeds without communication within the dyad using sensory cues. Professor Igor Val Danilov argues that this performance succeeds due to sharing an essential stimulus during a single cognitive task in the shared ecological context. Furthermore, research shows that shared intentionality can appear even in groups of more mature organisms due to their physiological synchrony and group dynamics. Therefore, this interaction can provide subliminal compliance of the participants to the group decisions, encouraging people to engage in acts they might consider unthinkable under typical social circumstances. The hypothesis of neurobiological processes occurring during shared intentionality explains how organisms can share relevant sensory stimuli without communication within the group using sensory cues.

== See also ==
- Bandwagon effect – Societal phenomenon
- Bioengineering
- Cognitive model § Mother-fetus cognitive model
- Collective consciousness – Shared beliefs and ideas in society
- Collective effervescence – Sociological concept coined by Émile Durkheim
- Collective hysteria
- Collective intelligence – Group intelligence that emerges from collective efforts
- Collective narcissism – Psychological tendency to exaggerate the positive image of one's social group
- Complex adaptive systems
- Crowd manipulation – Application of crowd psychology
- Crowd psychology – Branch of social psychology
- Group behaviour
- Herd behavior – Behavior of individuals acting in a group
- Herd morality
- Keeping up with the Joneses – Idiom on comparing oneself to neighbors
- Moral panic – Fear that some evil threatens society
- Panic buying – Unusual pattern of purchase
- Peer pressure – Influencing peers to conform
- Penis panic
- Shared intentionality – Psychological concept
- Sheeple
- Social comparison theory – Theory in social psychology
- Spiral of silence – Political science and mass communication theory
- Swarm behaviour – Collective behaviour of entities that swarm
- Systems science – Study of the nature of systems
- Theories of political behavior – Aspect of political science
- Viral phenomena
