= Glass escalator =

Men being fast tracked in female-dominated careers

The term "glass escalator" was introduced by Christine L. Williams in her article "The Glass Escalator: Hidden Advantages for Men in the "Female" Professions" published in August 1992. The article claims that men entering female-dominated professions (e.g., healthcare, teaching) are put on a fast track to advanced positions.

Female-dominated professions often pay lower wages than male-dominated professions, but males experience a phenomenon in which they earn higher wages and have faster career mobility when they enter feminine careers. This idea is akin to the more well-known idea of the glass ceiling, which explains the reality that women face when they fail to advance in the workplace. However, it has been found that men of minority backgrounds do not reap the same benefits of the glass escalator as men in the majority.

== Professional advancement ==
Whether the career is woman-dominated, men-dominated, or gender-balanced, men assume leadership positions at faster rates than women. Four female-dominated professions often considered are teaching, nursing, social work, and librarianship. Although these professions have gained more men in the past few decades, they remain sex-segregated and employ mostly women. Williams acknowledges that it is rare to find professions where men and women have equal representation at the same job level.

Often in these jobs, when men are hired, they are fast tracked to higher positions in roles of administration and leadership. This happens even when the men had little desire for these roles when applying and interviewing for their job. Christine L. Williams suggests that "as if on a moving escalator, they must work to stay in place," suggesting that their ascent into leadership roles will be effortless and inevitable. In addition to this inevitability, men are often pressured to take on these roles. It is suggested that this is because characteristics associated with men and masculinity are viewed as more desirable than feminine characteristics associated with womanhood.

== Negative aspects ==
Men also face some discouragement from entering female-dominated professions. In Christine L. William's research, she interviewed a male nurse who had intentions of going to grad school for family and child nursing. He was discouraged and pushed to go into adult nursing because of the heavier feminine connotation family and child nursing has as well as the sometimes-negative connotation of men working with children. Other men interviewed in the article were also discouraged from entering female-dominated professions.

== Men in nursing ==
Further scholarship has suggested that Black men experience discrimination, not an escalator, in female-dominated careers such as nursing While many men who enter nursing receive a warm welcome from women colleagues as "a response to the fact that professions dominated by women are frequently low in salary and status and that greater numbers of men help improve prestige and pay", this experience is gendered racism. Harvey Wingfield suggests that this is due to the socially constructed idea of black men being framed as threats to white women. Their higher ups may treat them poorly due to negative stereotypes about black men. They also find it harder to advance in their career because they are viewed as less qualified; while white male nurses may be mistaken by patients for doctors, black male nurses get mistaken for janitors.

Wingfield concludes that a shared racial identity with one's coworkers facilitates access to the glass escalator. White women tend not to value working with nurses of color, particularly when they are men. As a result, they do not assist in enhancing their black male colleagues' careers in nursing.

The glass escalator for nursing has also been found to exist in countries besides the United States. In Canada, male nurses are more likely to be in a higher income bracket if they are registered nurses. Additionally, male psychiatric nurses are more likely to be in management positions. In the UK, male nurses earn higher wages and have faster attainment of higher grades from the point of registration. Also, for specialist and advanced nurses, it has been seen that males are able to achieve a higher paid role faster than females.

== Men in teaching ==
Men in teaching have also been known to ascend the glass escalator into school administrative leadership positions. Andrew J. Cognard-Black examines the experience of men in teaching in "Riding the Glass Escalator to the Principal’s Office: Sex-Atypical Work Among Token Men in the United States". Cognard-Black notes that at the start of the 1990s, 28% of teachers were men. Through his research, he found that men had a much greater chance of advancing upward into school administrative positions than women.

Cognard-Black also conducted another study that revealed that men who work in elementary schools are three times more likely than women to rise to higher positions in administration. This, however, could be because of a male's stronger aspiration to become a principal than a female. Cognard-Black's research suggests that this could be due to the encouragement of male ambition within the workplace and women feeling as if they are in a socially constructed box.

== Contradictions ==
Christine Williams stated in her revisit to the topic of the "glass escalator" that in her original publication in 1992, she failed to address the issue of intersectionality in terms of race, sexuality, and class. She claimed that her original publication was based on the assumption of traditional work organizations that are now changing due to neoliberalism. She updated her stance on gender equality in the workplace to align with 21st century values, such as allowing the glass escalator to include how racism, homophobia, and class inequality advantage some groups of men and exclude and discriminate against others. Williams also stated that it might be best just to "retire" the concept of the glass escalator altogether.

There has been evidence that in order to ride the glass escalator, transgender and gay men need to conform to heteronormative appearances and behavior. Williams concludes that "Only those who embody the appropriate class-based aesthetic can ride the glass escalator".

In 2002, Michelle Budig published a study using data from the National Longitudinal Survey of Youth (NLSY) that measured the extent to which men’s advantages in earnings are greater, smaller, or the same across three types of workplaces: male-dominated, female-dominated, and gender-balanced. Her findings indicate that men experience advantages in both pay levels and wage growth across all job types, regardless of gender composition. This challenges theories suggesting that men might face disadvantages when they are tokens in female-dominated professions. Instead, Budig's research supports the concept of gendered organizations, where men are uniformly advantaged in earnings across various occupational contexts..

When examining how men experience benefits compared to other groups, white men receive the most monetary benefits compared to females and non-white men. The glass ceiling has been found to be mostly exclusive to white men compared to other races. Additionally, Researcher James Maume found strong predictive power that men do benefit from a glass escalator, but men and women do not have access to the same benefits due to the concept of the glass ceiling.
