= Christine Williams (sociologist) =

American sociologist (born 1959)

- Born: 1959 (age 66–67); San Antonio, Texas, United States
- Education: University of California, Berkeley
- Known for: Glass escalator
- Scientific career
- Workplaces: University of Texas at Austin (1988-present); University of Sydney (1992); University of Oklahoma (1986-1988)

Christine L. Williams (born 1959) is an American sociologist. She is a professor of Sociology and the Elsie and Stanley E. (Skinny) Adams Sr. Centennial Professor in Liberal Arts at the University of Texas at Austin. Her areas of specialization include gender, sexuality, and workplace inequality. Her research primarily involves gender discrimination at work.

== Early life and education ==
In 1959, Williams was born in San Antonio, Texas. She graduated high school at the Colegio Nueva Granada, Bogotá, Colombia.

In 1980, she received her Bachelor of Arts in sociology at the University of Oklahoma and was a member of Phi Beta Kappa. She received her Master of Arts in sociology in 1982 and her Ph.D. in sociology in 1986 at the University of California, Berkeley.

== Academic career ==
From 1986 to 1988, she was assistant professor of sociology at the University of Oklahoma. In 1992, she was visiting professor of Social Policy at the University of Sydney, Australia.

From 1988 to 1994, she was assistant professor of sociology at the University of Texas at Austin. She was subsequently promoted to the position of assistant professor of sociology at the university from 1994 to 1999. She was subsequently promoted to the position of Professor of Sociology at the university from 1999 to the present.

She was Adams Centennial Professorship in Liberal Arts fellow at the University of Texas at Austin from 2006 to 2014, and was chair of the sociology department at the university from 2010 to 2014.

She has served on the editorial board of various academic journals, including Contexts, Gender & Society, and Qualitative Sociology.

== Awards and honors ==
Williams was 111th President of the American Sociological Association (from 2019 to 2020).

In 2014, she received the Jessie Bernard Award “in recognition of scholarly work that has enlarged the horizons of sociology to encompass fully the role of women in society,"

Her work has been featured in articles by The New York Times, The Washington Post, Nature, Fort Worth Star-Telegram, The Dallas Morning News, and Austin-American Statesman, among others.

== Major works ==
=== Glass escalator ===
In her 1992 article, "The Glass Escalator: Hidden Advantages for Men in the "Female" Professions", Williams proposed the concept of the glass escalator. The glass escalator refers to the way men, namely heterosexual white men, are put on a fast track to advanced positions when entering primarily female-dominated professions. It is most present in "pink collar" professions, such as those in hands-on healthcare work or school teaching. Feminized care professions often pay lower wages than stereotypically male professions, but males experience a phenomenon in which they earn higher wages and have faster career mobility when they enter feminine careers. This idea is akin to the more well-known idea of the glass ceiling, which explains the reality that women face when they fail to advance in the workplace.

Williams revisited the concept in a 2013 article, "The Glass Escalator, Revisited: Gender Inequality in Neoliberal Times, SWS Feminist Lecturer". Williams suggests that the concept be more attentive to issues of intersectionality and changing market forces.

The concept of the glass escalator to describe barriers for female professional appeared in an article by Forbes and has been reprinted in over 20 academic books.

== Publications ==
- Williams, Christine L. (2013). "The Glass Escalator, Revisited: Gender Inequality in Neoliberal Times, SWS Feminist Lecturer". Gender & Society. 27 (5): 609–629. doi:10.1177/0891243213490232. ISSN 0891–2432.
- Williams, Christine L., Chandra Muller, and Kristine Kilanski. (2012). "Gendered organizations in the new economy." Gender & Society. 26 (4): 549–573. doi:10.1177/0891243212445466.
- Williams, Christine L., and Catherine Connell. (2010). "“Looking good and sounding right” aesthetic labor and social inequality in the retail industry." Work and Occupations. 37 (3): 349-377. doi: 10.1177/0730888410373744.
- Williams, Christine L., Patti A. Giuffre, and Kirsten Dellinger. (1999). "Sexuality in the workplace: Organizational control, sexual harassment, and the pursuit of pleasure." Annual review of sociology. 25 (1): 73–93. doi: 10.1146/annurev.soc.25.1.73
- Williams, Christine L. (1992). "The Glass Escalator: Hidden Advantages for Men in the "Female" Professions". Social Problems. 39 (3): 253–267. doi:10.2307/3096961. ISSN 0037–7791.
- Williams, Christine L. (1989). Gender differences at work: Women and men in non-traditional occupations. Berkeley, CA: Univ of California Press.
