= James D. Wright =

American sociologist (1947–2019)

- Born: November 6, 1947; Logansport, Indiana
- Died: April 29, 2019 (aged 71)
- Education: Purdue University, University of Wisconsin
- Spouse: Yes
- Children: 2
- Scientific career
- Fields: Sociology
- Workplaces: University of Central Florida
- Thesis: Political alienation in the United States: 1956–1970 (1973)

James David Wright (November 6, 1947 – April 29, 2019) was an American sociologist. He had been the Provost's Distinguished Research Professor in the Department of Sociology at the University of Central Florida since 2001. Since 2013, he had also been a Pegasus Professor there. He wrote 17 books and over 250 peer-reviewed papers. From 1978 until 2014, he was the editor-in-chief of the academic journal Social Science Research.

== Education and career ==
Wright received his bachelor's degree from Purdue University and his M.S. and Ph.D. from the University of Wisconsin. After receiving his Ph.D. in 1973, he joined the faculty of the University of Massachusetts Amherst as an assistant professor, where he remained until 1988, when he joined the faculty of Tulane University. In 2001, he left Tulane to join the sociology department at UCF as Distinguished Research Professor.

== Research ==
Wright has researched several topics in the field of sociology, including poverty, homelessness, covenant marriage, and gun control. His assessment of numerous studies regarding gun ownership concluded that using a gun in self-defense increases the chances of harm to oneself, while also decreasing the chances that the user will be victimized by a criminal. In 1983, he collaborated with Peter Rossi and Kathleen Daly on a study underwritten by the National Institute of Justice which showed that about 1% of privately owned guns in the United States are used in crime; the study reported that the "benefits of stricter gun controls ... are at best uncertain, and at worst close to nil." In 1986, he and Rossi published the book Armed and Considered Dangerous, which reported the results of a survey of 1,800 felons. They concluded, among other things, that handgun bans may be counterproductive, as criminals may switch to other, more dangerous weapons instead, and that criminals are more afraid of armed civilians than of being arrested by police.

=== Books and monographs ===
- A Florida State of Mind: An Unnatural History of America's Weirdest State (St. Martin's Press, 2019)
- Lost Souls: Manners and Morals in Contemporary American Society (Routledge, 2018)
- Violence, Periodization and Definition of the Cultural Revolution: A Case Study of Two Deaths by the Red Guards (Brill, 2018, with Joshua Zhang)
- Hunger in the Land of Plenty: A Critical Look at Food Insecurity (Lynne Rienner, 1018; with Amy M. Donley, Sara Strickhouser Vega)
- Poor and Homeless in the Sunshine State: Down and Out in Theme Park Nation (Routledge, 2011; with Amy M. Donely)
- Hard Lives, Mean Streets: Violence In The Lives Of Homeless Women (Northeastern University Press, 2010; with Jana L. Jasinski, Jennifer Wesely, Elizabeth E. Mustaine)
- Covenant Marriage: The Movement to Reclaim Tradition in America (Rutgers University Press, 2008; with Steven L. Nock, Laura A. Sanchez)
- Fixin' to Git: One Fan's Love Affair with NASCAR's Winston Cup (Duke University Press, 2002)
- Beside the Golden Door: Policy, Politics and the Homeless (Routledge, 1998; with Beth A. Rubin, Joel A. Devine)
- In the Line of Fire: Youth, Guns and Violence in Urban America (Aldine, 1995; with Joseph F. Sheley)
- Drugs as a Social Problem (HarperCollins, 1994; with Joel A. Devine)
- The Greatest of Evils: Urban Poverty and the American Underclass (Aldine, 1993; with Joel A. Devine)
- Address Unknown: The Homeless in America (Aldine, 1989)
- Homelessness and Health: A Special Report (McGraw Hill, 1987; with Eleanor Weber)
- Armed and Considered Dangerous: A Survey of Felons and Their Firearms (Aldine, 1986; with Peter H. Rossi)
- State of the Masses: Sources of Discontent, Change and Stability (Aldine, 1986, with Richard F. Hamilton)
- Under the Gun: Weapons, Crime, and Violence in America (Aldine, 1983; with Peter H. Rossi, Kathleen Daly)
