= Crowd psychology =

Branch of social psychology

Time-lapse video of a crowd at Saint-Lazare metro station in Paris during rush hour. Filmed in November 2025.

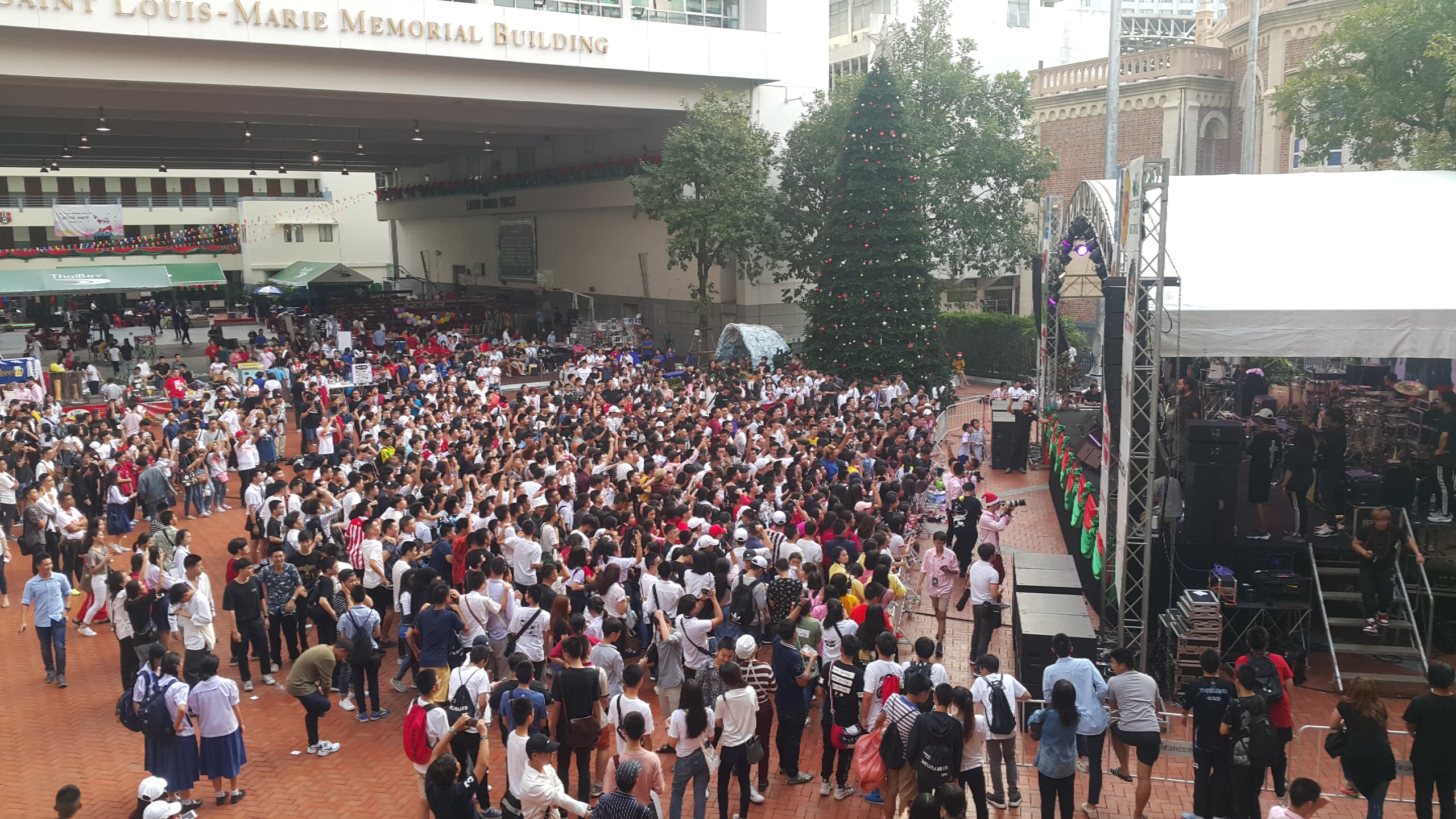
The psychology of a crowd is a collective behaviour realised by the individuals within it.

Crowd psychology (or mob psychology) is a subfield of social psychology which examines how the psychology of a group of people differs from the psychology of any one person within the group. The study of crowd psychology looks into the actions and thought processes of both the individual members of the crowd and of the crowd as a collective social entity. The behavior of a crowd is much influenced by deindividuation (seen as a person's loss of responsibility) and by the person's impression of the universality of behavior, both of which conditions increase in magnitude with size of the crowd. Notable theorists in crowd psychology include Gustave Le Bon (1841-1931), Gabriel Tarde (1843-1904), and Sigmund Freud (1856-1939). Many of these theories are today tested or used to simulate crowd behaviors in normal or emergency situations. One of the main focuses in these simulation works aims to prevent crowd crushes and stampedes.

== Origins ==
According to his biological theory of criminology, which suggests that criminality is inherited and that someone "born criminal" could be identified by the way they look, Enrico Ferri expressed his view of crime as a degeneration more profound than insanity, for in most insane persons the primitive moral sense survives the wreck of their intelligence. Along similar lines were the remarks of Benedickt, Sergi and Marro. A response from the French, who put forward an environmental theory of human psychology, M. Anguilli called attention to the importance of the influence of the social environment upon crime. Professor Alexandre Lacassagne thought that the atavistic and degenerative theories as held by the Italian school were exaggerations and false interpretations of the facts, and that the important factor was the social environment."

In Paris during 10–17 August 1889, the Italian school received a stronger rebuke of their biological theories during the 2nd International Congress of Criminal Anthropology. A radical divergence in the views between the Italian and the French schools was reflected in the proceedings.

"Professor Lombroso laid stress upon epilepsy in connection with his theory of the 'born criminal'. Professor Léonce Pierre Manouvrier characterized Lombroso's theory as nothing but the exploded science of phrenology. The anomalies observed by Lombroso were met with in honest men as well as criminals, Manouvrier claimed, and there is no physical difference between them. Baron Raffaele Garofalo, Drill, Alexandre Lacassagne and Benedikt opposed Lombroso's theories in whole or in part. Pugliese found the cause of crime in the failure of the criminal to adapt himself to his social surroundings, and Benedikt, with whom Tarde agreed, held that physical defects were not marks of the criminal qua criminal." It is in this context that you have a debate between Scipio Sighele, an Italian lawyer and Gabriel Tarde, a French magistrate on how to determine criminal responsibility in the crowd and hence who to arrest. (Sighele, 1892; Tarde, 1890, 1892, 1901) Both thinkers had published early studies on this matter (Sighele wrote "The Criminal Crowd", and Tarde "La criminalité comparée".)

Earlier, literature on crowds and crowd behavior had appeared as early as 1841, with the publication of Charles Mackay's book Extraordinary Popular Delusions and the Madness of Crowds. The attitude towards crowds underwent an adjustment with the publication of Hippolyte Taine's six-volume The Origins of Contemporary France (1875). In particular Taine's work helped to change the opinions of his contemporaries on the actions taken by the crowds during the 1789 Revolution. Many Europeans held him in great esteem. While it is difficult to directly link his works to crowd behavior, it may be said that his thoughts stimulated further study of crowd behavior. However, it was not until the latter half of the 19th century that scientific interest in the field gained momentum. French physician and anthropologist Gustave Le Bon became its most-influential theorist.

== Types of crowds ==
There is limited research into the types of crowd and crowd membership and there is no consensus as to the classification of types of crowds. Two recent scholars, Momboisse (1967) and Berlonghi (1995) focused upon purpose of existence to differentiate among crowds. Momboisse developed a system of four types: casual, conventional, expressive, and aggressive. Berlonghi classified crowds as spectator, demonstrator, or escaping, to correlate to the purpose for gathering.

Another approach to classifying crowds is sociologist Herbert Blumer's system of emotional intensity. He distinguishes four types of crowds: casual, conventional, expressive, and active. A group of people who just so happen to be at the same location at the same time is known as a casual crowd. This kind of mob lacks any true identity, long-term goal, or shared connection. A group of individuals who come together for a particular reason is known as a conventional crowd. They could be going to a theater, concert, movie, or lecture. According to Erich Goode, conventional crowds behave in a very conventional and hence somewhat structured manner; as their name suggests, they do not truly act out collective behavior. A group of people who come together solely to show their excitement and feelings is known as an expressive crowd. A political candidate's rally, a religious revival, and celebrations like Mardi Gras are a few examples. An active crowd behaves violently or in other damaging ways, such looting, going above and beyond an expressive crowd. One of the main examples of an acting crowd is a mob, which is an extremely emotional group that either commits or is prepared to do violence. A crowd changes its level of emotional intensity over time, and therefore, can be classed in any one of the four types.

Generally, researchers in crowd psychology have focused on the negative aspects of crowds, but not all crowds are volatile or negative in nature. For example, in the beginning of the socialist movement crowds were asked to put on their Sunday dress and march silently down the street. A more-modern example involves the sit-ins during the Civil Rights movement. Crowds can reflect and challenge the held ideologies of their sociocultural environment. They can also serve integrative social functions, creating temporary communities.

Crowds can be defined as active ("mobs") or passive ("audiences"). Active crowds can be further divided into aggressive, escapist, acquisitive, or expressive mobs. Aggressive mobs are often violent and outwardly focused. Examples are football riots, the Los Angeles riots of 1992, and the 2011 English riots. Escapist mobs are characterized by a large number of people trying to get out of a dangerous situation like the November 2021 Astroworld Festival. Incidents involving crowds are often reported by media as the results of "panic", but some experts have criticized the media's implication that panic is a main cause of crowd disasters, noting that actual panic is relatively rare in fire situations, and that the major factors in dangerous crowd incidents are infrastructure design, crowd density and breakdowns in communication. Acquisitive mobs occur when large numbers of people are fighting for limited resources. An expressive mob is any other large group of people gathering for an active purpose. Civil disobedience, rock concerts, and religious revivals all fall under this category.

== Theoretical perspectives ==
=== Le Bon ===
Gustave Le Bon held that crowds existed in three stages: submergence, contagion, and suggestion. During submergence, the individuals in the crowd lose their sense of individual self and personal responsibility. This is quite heavily induced by the anonymity of the crowd. Contagion refers to the propensity for individuals in a crowd to unquestioningly follow the predominant ideas and emotions of the crowd. In Le Bon's view, this effect is capable of spreading between "submerged" individuals much like a disease. Suggestion refers to the period in which the ideas and emotions of the crowd are primarily drawn from a shared unconscious ideology. Crowd members become susceptible to any passing idea or emotion. This behavior comes from an archaic shared unconscious and is therefore uncivilized in nature. It is limited by the moral and cognitive abilities of the least capable members. Le Bon believed that crowds could be a powerful force only for destruction. Additionally, Le Bon and others have indicated that crowd members feel a lessened sense of legal culpability, due to the difficulty in prosecuting individual members of a mob. In short, the individual submerged in the crowd loses self control as the "collective mind" takes over and makes the crowd member capable of violating personal or social norms.

Le Bon's idea that crowds foster anonymity and generate emotion has been contested by some critics. Clark McPhail points out studies which show that "the madding crowd" does not take on a life of its own, apart from the thoughts and intentions of members. Norris Johnson, after investigating a panic at a 1979 The Who concert concluded that the crowd was composed of many small groups of people mostly trying to help each other. Additionally, Le Bon's theory ignores the socio-cultural context of the crowd, which some theorists argue can disempower social change. R. Brown disputes the assumption that crowds are homogenous, suggesting instead that participants exist on a continuum, differing in their ability to deviate from social norms.

=== Freudian theory ===
Sigmund Freud's crowd behavior theory primarily consists of the idea that becoming a member of a crowd serves to unlock the unconscious mind. This occurs because the super-ego, or moral center of consciousness, is displaced by the larger crowd, to be replaced by a charismatic crowd leader. McDougall argues similarly to Freud, saying that simplistic emotions are widespread, and complex emotions are rarer. In a crowd, the overall shared emotional experience reverts to the least common denominator (LCD), leading to primitive levels of emotional expression. This organizational structure is that of the "primal horde"—pre-civilized society—and Freud states that one must rebel against the leader (re-instate the individual morality) in order to escape from it.

Theodor Adorno criticized the belief in a spontaneity of the masses: according to him, the masses were an artificial product of "administrated" modern life. The Ego of the bourgeois subject dissolved itself, giving way to the Id and the "de-psychologized" subject. Furthermore, Adorno stated the bond linking the masses to the leader through the spectacle is feigned:

"When the leaders become conscious of mass psychology and take it into their own hands, it ceases to exist in a certain sense. ... Just as little as people believe in the depth of their hearts that the Jews are the devil, do they completely believe in their leader. They do not really identify themselves with him but act this identification, perform their own enthusiasm, and thus participate in their leader's performance. ... It is probably the suspicion of this fictitiousness of their own 'group psychology' which makes fascist crowds so merciless and unapproachable. If they would stop to reason for a second, the whole performance would go to pieces, and they would be left to panic."

=== Deindividuation theory ===
Deindividuation theory is largely based on the ideas of Gustave Le Bon and argues that in typical crowd situations, factors such as anonymity, group unity, and arousal can weaken personal controls (e.g. guilt, shame, self-evaluating behavior) by distancing people from their personal identities and reducing their concern for social evaluation. This lack of restraint increases individual sensitivity to the environment and lessens rational forethought, which can lead to antisocial behavior. More recent theories have stated that deindividuation hinges upon a person being unable, due to situation, to have strong awareness of their self as an object of attention. This lack of attention frees the individual from the necessity of normal social behavior.

American social psychologist Leon Festinger and colleagues first elaborated the concept of deindividuation in 1952. It was further refined by American psychologist Philip Zimbardo, who detailed why mental input and output became blurred by such factors as anonymity, lack of social constraints, and sensory overload. Zimbardo's Stanford Prison Experiment has been presented as a strong argument for the power of deindividuation, although it was later criticised as unscientific. Further experimentation has had mixed results when it comes to aggressive behaviors, and has instead shown that the normative expectations surrounding the situations of deindividuation influence behavior (i.e. if one is deindividuated as a KKK member, aggression increases, but if it is as a nurse, aggression does not increase).

A further distinction has been proposed between public and private deindividuation. When private aspects of self are weakened, one becomes more subject to crowd impulses, but not necessarily in a negative way. It is when one no longer attends to the public reaction and judgement of individual behavior that antisocial behavior is elicited. Philip Zimbardo also did not view deindividuation exclusively as a group phenomenon, and applied the concept to suicide, murder, and interpersonal hostility.

=== Convergence theory ===
Convergence theory holds that crowd behavior is not a product of the crowd, but rather the crowd is a product of the coming together of like-minded individuals. Floyd Allport argued that "An individual in a crowd behaves just as he would behave alone, only more so." Convergence theory holds that crowds form from people of similar dispositions, whose actions are then reinforced and intensified by the crowd.

Convergence theory claims that crowd behavior is not irrational; rather, people in crowds express existing beliefs and values so that the mob reaction is the rational product of widespread popular feeling. However, this theory is questioned by certain research which found that people involved in the 1970s riots were less likely than nonparticipant peers to have previous convictions.

Critics of this theory report that it still excludes the social determination of self and action, in that it argues that all actions of the crowd are born from the individuals' intents.

=== Emergent norm theory ===
Ralph H. Turner and Lewis Killian put forth the idea that norms emerge from within the crowd. Emergent norm theory states that crowds have little unity at their outset, but during a period of milling about, key members suggest appropriate actions, and following members fall in line, forming the basis for the crowd's norms.

Key members are identified through distinctive personalities or behaviors. These garner attention, and the lack of negative response elicited from the crowd as a whole stands as tacit agreement to their legitimacy. The followers form the majority of the mob, as people tend to be creatures of conformity who are heavily influenced by the opinions of others. This has been shown in the conformity studies conducted by Sherif and Asch. Crowd members are further convinced by the universality phenomenon, described by Allport as the persuasive tendency of the idea that if everyone in the mob is acting in such-and-such a way, then it cannot be wrong.

Emergent norm theory allows for both positive and negative mob types, as the distinctive characteristics and behaviors of key figures can be positive or negative in nature. An antisocial leader can incite violent action, but an influential voice of non-violence in a crowd can lead to a mass sit-in. When a crowd described as above targets an individual, anti-social behaviors may emerge within its members.

A major criticism of this theory is that the formation and following of new norms indicates a level of self-awareness that is often missing in the individuals in crowds (as evidenced by the study of deindividuation). Another criticism is that the idea of emergent norms fails to take into account the presence of existent sociocultural norms. Additionally, the theory fails to explain why certain suggestions or individuals rise to normative status while others do not.

=== Social identity approach ===
The concept of social identity was originally introduced in Tajfel and Turner's (1979) social identity theory, which aimed to explain intergroup behavior. A core idea of the theory is that, in addition to personal identities, individuals possess multiple social identities derived from their group memberships. These social identities significantly influence thought processes, emotions, and behaviours. The theory was later expanded into self-categorization theory (Turner et al., 1987), which offers a more detailed understanding of the processes through which groups form. According to this theory, the basis of identities is categorization of oneself and others; different identities can become prominent depending on the group context.

The main idea behind the social identity approach is that people have different social identities, and each one influences how they behave. This idea was central to Reicher's (1984, 1987) model of crowd behaviour, developed from his study of the 1980 St Pauls riot. Unlike earlier theories, like Le Bon's, which claimed people lose their sense of self in a crowd, Reicher argued that people don't lose who their sense of self. Instead, they shift from thinking as individuals to thinking as part of a group. This means their behaviour is not out of control, but guided by the group's shared beliefs about what's appropriate. In the St Pauls riot, the crowd didn't act randomly, their actions reflected a shared group identity and clear sense of purpose.

Reicher (2012) unified earlier and newer research on social identity and crowd behaviour through a framework called the "three transformations," which helps explain many key theories and findings in this area. The first transformation is cognitive. It refers to the shift from seeing oneself as an individual to identifying as part of a group. This shift leads people to adopt the group's norms, values, and goals as their own. When group identity is salient, individuals tend to view others in terms of group membership, respond more to group-consistent messages, and even experience discomfort more positively when it affirms group identity.

The second transformation is relational. It occurs when people not only identify with a group but also recognize that others present share the same identity. This shared identity leads to greater trust, intimacy, cooperation, and coordination. It also forms the basis for distinguishing between physical crowds people and psychological crowds, where shared identity enables spontaneous collective behavior.

The third transformation is affective. As a result of shared identity and support, people feel empowered to express their group identity in ways they usually cannot. This process, known as collective self-objectification, creates a strong sense of emotional positivity and fulfilment within the crowd experience.

While the three transformations framework focuses on internal crowd dynamics, the social identity approach also emphasizes intergroup relations, particularly between crowds and external groups like the police (Reicher, 1984, 1987). Reicher's original model evolved into the Elaborated Social Identity Model (ESIM), which explains how conflict in crowd events arises through identity change (Drury & Reicher, 2000; Reicher, 1996; Stott & Reicher, 1998).

According to ESIM, two main conditions contribute to the development and escalation of conflict between a crowd and another group, such as the police. First, there is a clash in how each group categorizes the behaviour at the event. For example, crowd members may see their actions as a legitimate protest, while police may interpret them as a threat to public order. Second, there is an imbalance of power, with the police having the ability to enforce their definition of what behavior is acceptable, often through physical control or dispersal.

When police action is seen by the crowd as illegitimate - such as being perceived as an attack on their right to protest - it can justify resistance. If that action is also viewed as indiscriminate, affecting everyone in the crowd regardless of individual behaviour, it can create a sense of shared fate. This shared experience can lead to the formation of a common identity within an otherwise diverse crowd, overriding internal differences and enhancing.

As this new collective identity forms, it brings a sense of unity, enhanced expectations of support for ingroup-normative actions, and legitimacy for resisting the outgroup (in this case, the police).

The social identity approach to the crowd was extended to explain behaviour in mass emergencies. This was often found to involve cooperation amongst strangers, and research suggested that this spontaneous coordination reflected the emergence in the crisis of a new shared social identity (Drury, 2018). One of the most notable developments in crowd behaviour research over the past 20 years has been the application of the social identity approach to everyday, non-crisis crowd settings, including religious mass gatherings, music events, and pedestrian flow (Drury, 2025).

== See also ==
- Bystander effect
- Collective behavior
- Collective hysteria
- Collective consciousness
- Collective unconscious
- Communal reinforcement
- Crowds and Power
- The Wisdom of Crowds
- Group behaviour
- Groupthink
- Herd behavior
- Herd mentality
- The Mass Psychology of Fascism
- Mass society
- Volksgeist ("Spirit of the People")
- Völkerpsychologie
