= Contentious politics =

Disruptive action oriented to change

Contentious politics is the use of disruptive techniques to make a political point, or to change government policy. Examples of such techniques are actions that disturb the normal activities of society such as demonstrations, general strike action, direct action, riot, terrorism, civil disobedience, and even revolution or insurrection. Social movements often engage in contentious politics. The concept distinguishes these forms of contention from the everyday acts of resistance explored by James C. Scott, interstate warfare, and forms of contention employed entirely within institutional settings, such as elections or sports. Historical sociologist Charles Tilly defines contentious politics as "interactions in which actors make claims bearing on someone else's interest, in which governments appear either as targets, initiators of claims, or third parties."

Contentious politics has existed forever, but its form varies over time and space. For example, Tilly argues that the nature of contentious politics changed fairly dramatically with the birth of social movements in 18th-century Europe.

The concept of contentious politics was developed throughout the 1990s and into the 21st century by its most prominent scholars in the United States: Sidney Tarrow, Charles Tilly, and Doug McAdam. Until its development, the study of contentious politics was divided among a number of traditions each of which were concerned with the description and explanation of different contentious political phenomena, especially the social movement, the strike, and revolution. One of the primary goals of these three authors was to advance the explanation of these phenomena and other contentious politics under a single research agenda. There remains a significant plurality of agendas in addition to the one these three propose.

Contentious and disruptive political tactics may overlap with movements for social justice. For example, the political theorist Clarissa Rile Hayward has argued that theories, in particular that of Iris Marion Young, that situate the responsibility to correct large-scale injustices like institutional racism with the groups that benefit from oppressive institutions overlook the fact that people will rarely challenge institutions that benefit them. She argues that in certain cases contentious politics are the only practical resolution.

== Prominent scholars ==
- Doug McAdam – American sociologist (born 1951)
- Charles Tilly – American sociologist (1929–2008)
- Sidney Tarrow – American political scientist (born 1938)
- Theda Skocpol – American sociologist and political scientist (born 1947)
- Mark Beissinger – American political scientist
- William Gamson – American sociologist (1934–2021)
- Frances Fox Piven – American sociologist (born 1932)
- Richard Cloward – American sociologist and activist (1926–2001)
- James Jasper – American writer and sociologist
- Donatella della Porta – Italian sociologist and political scientist
- David A. Snow – American sociologist
- Deborah Gould
- Fancesca Polletta
- Dana R. Fisher – American sociologist
- Jack Goldstone – American historian
- Erica Chenoweth – American political scientist (born 1980)
- Gene Sharp – American political scientist (1928–2018)
- Stathis Kalyvas – Greek university teacher
- Zeynep Tufekci – Turkish sociologist and writer
- David S. Meyer
- Javier Auyero
- Deborah Yashar – American political scientist (born 1963)
- Jeff Goodwin – American sociologist
- Sarah A. Soule – American sociologist
- Maria Stephan – American political scientist
- Kurt Schock
- Elisabeth Jean Wood – American political scientist
- Asef Bayat – Iranian-American scholar
- Omar Wasow – American academic and entrepreneur
- Jackie Smith – American football player (born 1940)
- Kathleen Blee – American sociologist
- Hahrie Han

== Prominent advocates ==
Left	Liberal	Right
Frantz Fanon – French West Indian psychiatrist and philosopher (1925–1961); Audre Lorde – American writer and feminist activist (1934–1992); John Brown – American abolitionist (1800–1859); Malcolm X – American civil rights activist (1925–1965); Che Guevara – Argentine revolutionary (1928–1967); Rosa Luxemburg – Polish-German Marxist revolutionary (1871–1919); Emma Goldman – Lithuanian-born anarchist, writer and orator (1869–1940); Huey P. Newton – Founder of the Black Panther Party (1942–1989); Subcomandante Marcos – Mexican insurgent and spokesperson of EZLN; Saul Alinsky – American activist and political theorist (1909–1972); Vladimir Lenin – Leader of the Soviet Union from 1922 to 1924; Martin Luther King – American civil rights leader (1929–1968); Mahatma Gandhi – Indian independence activist (1869–1948); Nelson Mandela – President of South Africa from 1994 to 1999; Henry David Thoreau – American philosopher (1817–1862); Mao Zedong – Leader of China from 1949 to 1976; Angela Davis – American academic and political activist (born 1944)	Samuel Adams – Founding Father of the United States (1722–1803); Patrick Henry – American Founding Father, orator and politician (1736–1799); Andrei Sakharov – Soviet nuclear physicist and human rights activist (1921–1989); Joshua Wong – Hong Kong pro-democracy activist (born 1996); Thomas Jefferson – Founding Father, U.S. president from 1801 to 1809; John Hancock – American Founding Father (1737–1793); Thomas Paine – American philosopher and author (1737–1809); Simón Bolívar – Venezuelan statesman and military officer (1783–1830); Lajos Kossuth – Hungarian statesman (1802–1894); Giuseppe Garibaldi – Italian patriot and general (1807–1882); Giuseppe Mazzini – Italian nationalist activist, politician, journalist and philosopher; José Rizal – Filipino nationalist, writer and polymath (1861–1896); Václav Havel – Last president of Czechoslovakia and first president of the Czech Republic (1936–2011); Liu Xiaobo – Chinese human rights activist (1955–2017); Aung San Suu Kyi – Burmese politician (born 1945); Alexei Navalny – Russian opposition leader (1976–2024); Srđa Popović – Serbian political activist and leader of Otpor	Enrique Tarrio – American far-right activist (born 1984); David Duke – American white supremacist (born 1950); Ayatollah Ruhollah Khomeini – Supreme Leader of Iran from 1979 to 1989; Benito Mussolini – Dictator of Italy from 1922 to 1943; Corneliu Z. Codreanu – Romanian politician (1899–1938); Oswald Mosley – British aristocrat and fascist politician (1896–1980); Stewart Rhodes – Oath Keepers leader and seditionist; Otoya Yamaguchi – Japanese ultranationalist and assassin (1943–1960); Ammon Bundy – American anti-government activist; Gavin McInnes – Canadian far-right commentator; Alexander Dugin – Russian political activist and philosopher (born 1962); Carlos Castaño Gil – Colombian paramilitary leader (1965–2004); Mullah Mohammed Omar – Afghan militant leader and founder of the Taliban (1960–2013); Abubakar Shekau – Nigerian militant and former leader of Boko Haram; Yigal Amir – Israeli assassin (born 1970); Ze'ev Jabotinsky – Russian Revisionist Zionist leader (1880–1940); Itamar Ben-Gvir – Israeli far-right politician and lawyer (born 1976)

== Academic journals ==
- Mobilization: The International Quarterly Review of Social Movement Research
- Social Movement Studies
- Contention: The Multidisciplinary Journal of Social Protest

== See also ==
- Social movement theory
