= Contexts =

American sociology journal

- Discipline: Sociology
- Language: English
- Edited by: Amin Ghaziani, Seth Abrutyn

Publication details
- History: 2002-present
- Publisher: SAGE Publications for the American Sociological Association
- Frequency: Quarterly

Standard abbreviations
- ISO 4: Contexts

Indexing
- ISSN: 1536-5042 (print); 1537-6052 (web)
- LCCN: 2001215451
- OCLC no.: 48247109

Links
- Journal homepage; Online archive

Contexts: Understanding People in their Social Worlds is a quarterly peer-reviewed academic journal and an official publication of the American Sociological Association. It is designed to be a more accessible source of sociological ideas and research and has been inspired by the movement towards public sociology.

== Sections of the Journal ==
- Backpage
- Books
- Culture
- Feature
- From the Editors
- In brief
- Q&A
- Teaching and Learning
- Trends
- Viewpoints

== History ==
The journal was established in 2002 by Claude Fischer and is published by SAGE Publications; until 2011, it was published by the University of California Press. Fischer was succeeded by Jeff Goodwin and James M. Jasper, who edited the journal from 2005 to 2007, injecting a certain amount of controversial humor such as New Yorker cartoons and a column written by "Harry Green" (actually Jasper) called "The Fool." The current editors are Seth Abrutyn (University of British Columbia) and Amin Ghaziani (University of British Columbia).

== Former Editors ==
- 2002: Claude Fischer
- 2003: Fischer
- 2004: Fischer
- 2005: Jeff Goodwin, James M. Jasper
- 2006: Goodwin, Jasper
- 2007: Goodwin, Jasper
- 2008: Doug Hartmann, Chris Uggen
- 2009: Hartmann, Uggen
- 2010: Hartmann, Uggen
- 2011: Hartmann, Uggen
- 2012: Jodi O'Brien, Arlene Stein
- 2013: O'Brien, Stein
- 2014: O'Brien, Stein
- 2015: Philip N. Cohen, Syed Ali
- 2016: Cohen, Ali
- 2017: Cohen, Ali
- 2018: Fabio Rojas, Rashawn Ray
- 2019: Rojas, Ray
- 2020: Rojas, Ray
- 2021: Rojas, Ray
- 2022: Rojas, Ray
- 2023: Seth Abrutyn, Amin Ghaziani (UBC)
- 2024: Abrutyn, Ghaziani

== Characteristics ==
The journal differs from a typical academic journal as it is targeted more toward students and the general public. It is used widely in courses,, and a selection of its premier articles is available in book format through The Contexts Reader, published by W. W. Norton & Company, now in its second edition.

The new editors have introduced a blog feature on the magazines website, Contexts.org.

New print issues are published quarterly in February (Winter), May (Spring), August (Summer) and November (Fall).

== Awards ==
Contexts won the Best Journal Award in the Social Sciences (2003) by Professional and Scholarly Publishing Division of the Association of American Publishers.

== Notable Articles and Interviews ==
One of the most notable articles in Contexts is Ann Morning's interview with Rachel Doležal. The interview has aired on many TV news networks, such as Fox News, BBC, and USA Today, over the possibility of a trans-racial identity.

The academic journal ranges in topics from social mobility, immigration, race, Donald Trump's potential border wall, and Buffy the Vampire Slayer.

One of the board members for Contexts, Tressie McMillan Cottom, appeared on The Daily Show with Trevor Noah to discuss the impact of for-profit higher education in the United States on disadvantaged students.

== Abstracting and indexing ==
Contexts is abstracted and indexed in SocINDEX and Sociological Abstracts.
