= Revolutionary movement =

Social movement dedicated to carrying out a revolution

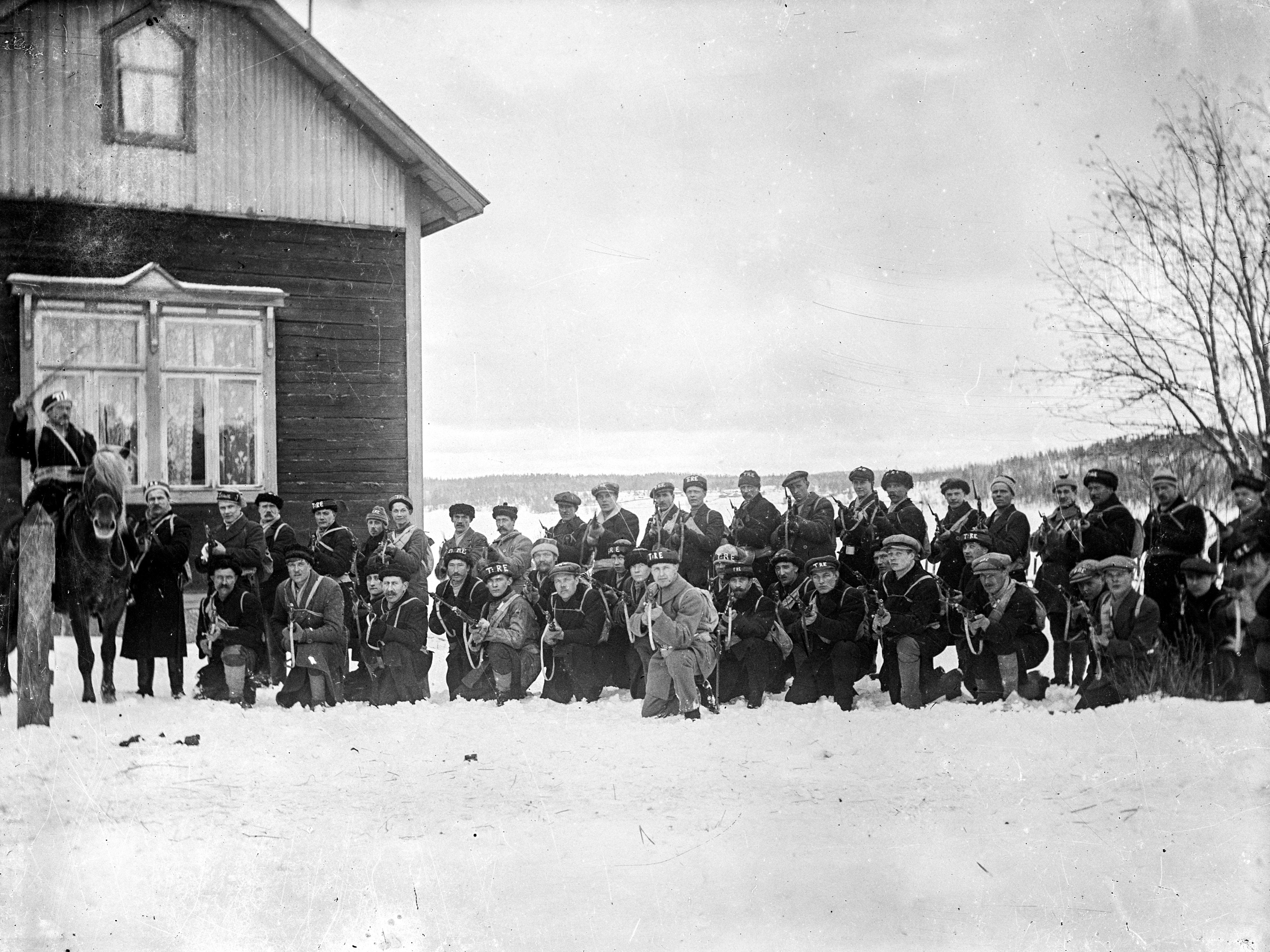
The Red Guards, the group of Finnish revolutionaries during the 1918 Finnish Civil War in Tampere, Finland

A revolutionary movement (or revolutionary social movement) is a specific type of social movement dedicated to carrying out a revolution.

== Criteria ==
Charles Tilly defines it as "a social movement advancing exclusive competing claims to control of the state, or some segment of it". Jeff Goodwin and James M. Jasper define it more simply (and consistently with other works) as "a social movement that seeks, as minimum, to overthrow the government or state".

A social movement may want to make various reforms and to gain some control of the state, but as long as they do not aim for an exclusive control, its members are not revolutionary. Social movements may become more radical and revolutionary, or vice versa - revolutionary movements can scale down their demands and agree to share powers with others, becoming a run-of-the-mill political party.

Goodwin distinguishes between a conservative (reformist) and radical revolutionary movements, depending on how much of a change they want to introduce. A conservative or reformist revolutionary movement will want to change fewer elements of the socio-economic and cultural system than a radical reformist movement (Godwin also notes that not all radical movements have to be revolutionary). A radical revolutionary movement will thus want both to take an exclusive control of the state, and to fundamentally transform one or more elements of its society, economy or culture.

== Examples ==
An example of a conservative movement would be the American Revolutionary movement of the 18th century, or the Mexican Revolutionary movement of the early 20th century. Examples of radical revolutionary movements include the Bolsheviks in Russia, the Chinese Communist Party and other communist movements in Southeast Asia and in Cuba (which attempted to introduce broad changes to the economic system), the movements of the 1979 Iranian Revolution against the shah, and some Central American guerrilla movements. For a movement to be considered revolutionary in the modern-day United States it should call for a change of the dominant economic system (capitalism) or the political system (two-party representative democracy) operating in that society.

The same social movement may be viewed differently depending on a given context (usually the government of the country where it unfolds). For example, Jack Goldstone notes that the human rights movement can be seen as a regular social movement in the West, but it is a revolutionary movement under oppressive régimes like that in China. Another example he mentions was the racial equality movement, which could be seen as revolutionary a few decades ago in South Africa, but as of 1998 is just a regular social movement.

== Factors ==
A revolutionary movement can be non-violent, although it is less common than not. Revolutionary movements usually have a wider repertoire of contention than non-revolutionary ones.

Five crucial factors to the development and success of a revolutionary movements include:

1. mass discontent leading to popular uprisings
2. dissident political movements with élite participation
3. strong and unifying motivations across major parts of the society
4. a significant political crisis affecting the state - reducing state ability or will to deal with the opposition (see political opportunity)
5. external support (or at last, lack of interference on behalf of the state)

== See also ==
- List of social movements
