= Bad apples =

English-language metaphor

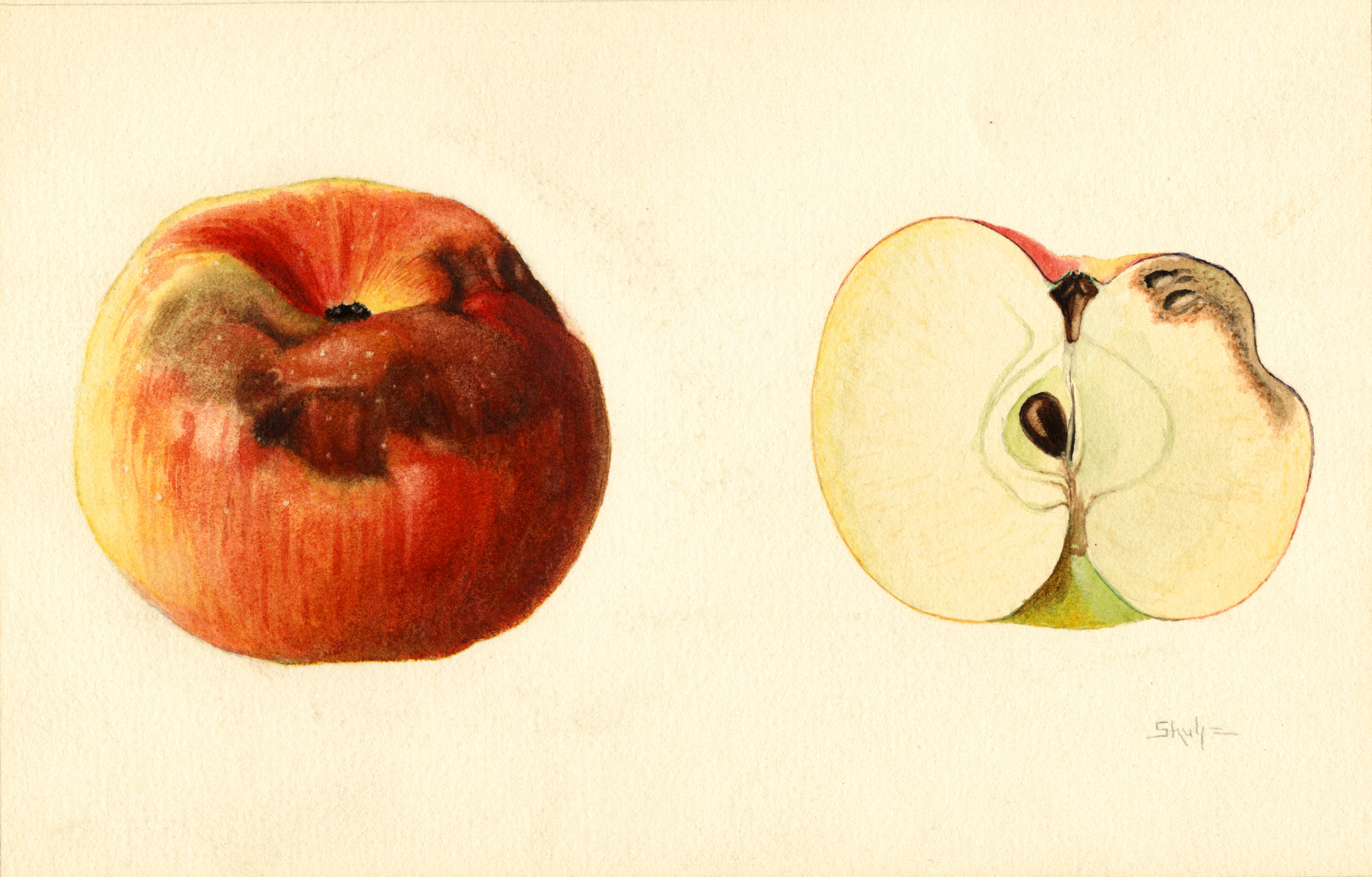
A watercolor of a bad apple

The bad apples metaphor originated as a warning of the corrupting influence of one corrupt or sinful person on a group: that "one bad apple can spoil the barrel". Over time the concept has been used to describe the opposite situation, where "a few bad apples" should not be seen as representative of the rest of their group. This latter version is often used in the context of police misconduct.

== Origins ==
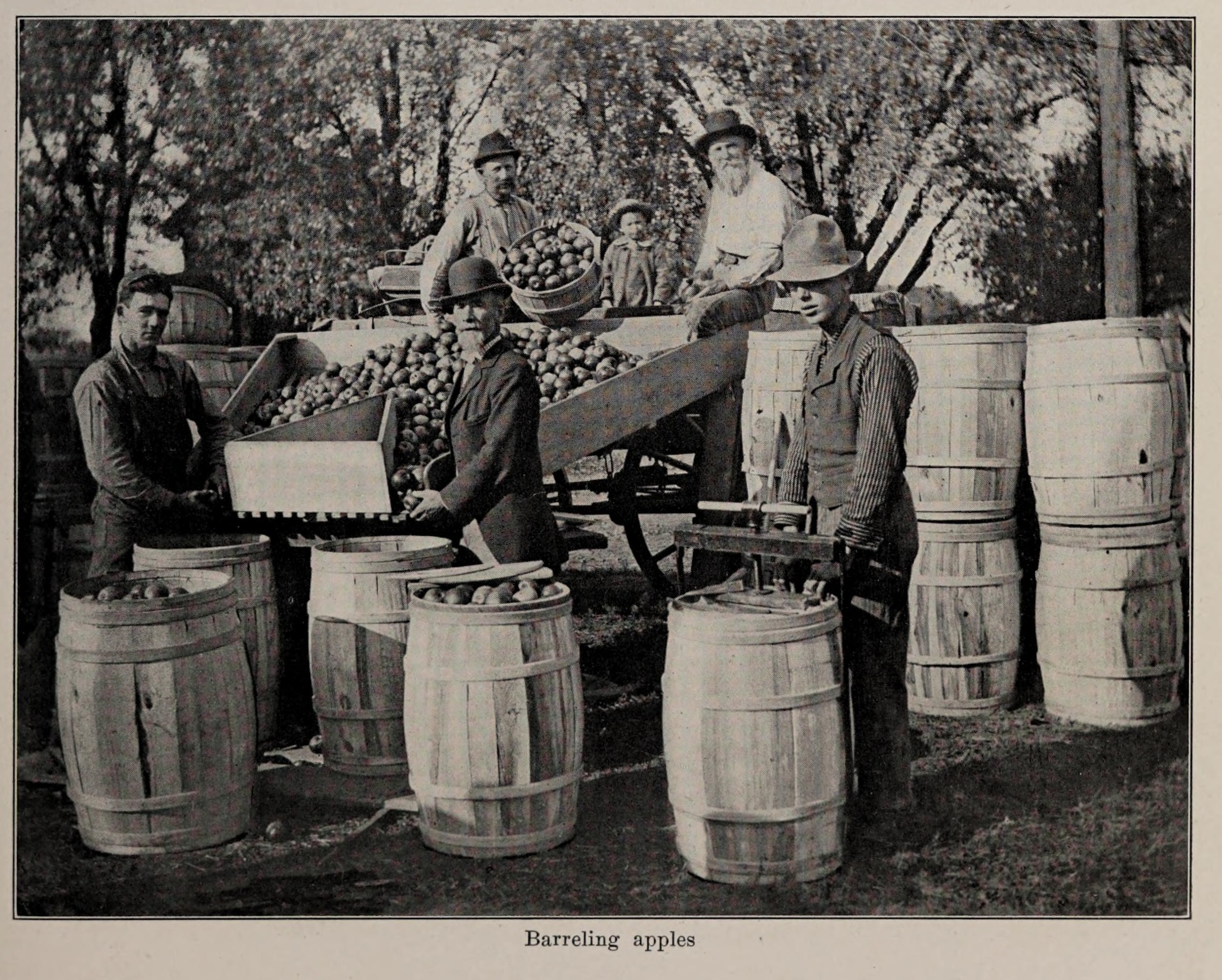
Apples being transported in barrels, 1923

The bad apples metaphor originates from the proverb "A rotten apple quickly infects its neighbor", first recorded as used in English in 1340. The proverb was rephrased by Benjamin Franklin in Poor Richard's Almanack in 1736, stating "the rotten apple spoils his companion." The phrase was popularized by sermons during the 19th century, claiming "As one bad apple spoils the others, so you must show no quarter to sin or sinners." A popular form of the saying became "One bad apple spoils the barrel."

The saying has scientific basis: as well as mold being able to spread from one rotten fruit to others, ripening apples produce ethylene gas, which triggers aging and increases ethylene production in other, nearby apples.

=== Change in meaning ===
Linguists such as Ben Zimmer have pointed out that the proverb began to be used in the opposite sense in the 20th century, instead stating that "a few bad apples" are not representative of a group. According to Zimmer, this usage may have corresponded to the change in the grocery trade, where modern shops sold apples individually and would rarely put rotten ones on display, and people stopped thinking of apples as being stored in barrels. Zimmer said that "once the phrase is out there again and people are saying 'one bad apple,' you think, 'What could that mean?' Then you can assign it new meaning."

Zimmer suggests the change in usage may have been solidified by the Osmonds 1971 song "One Bad Apple", which includes the line "One bad apple don’t spoil the whole bunch, girl."

== Modern usage ==
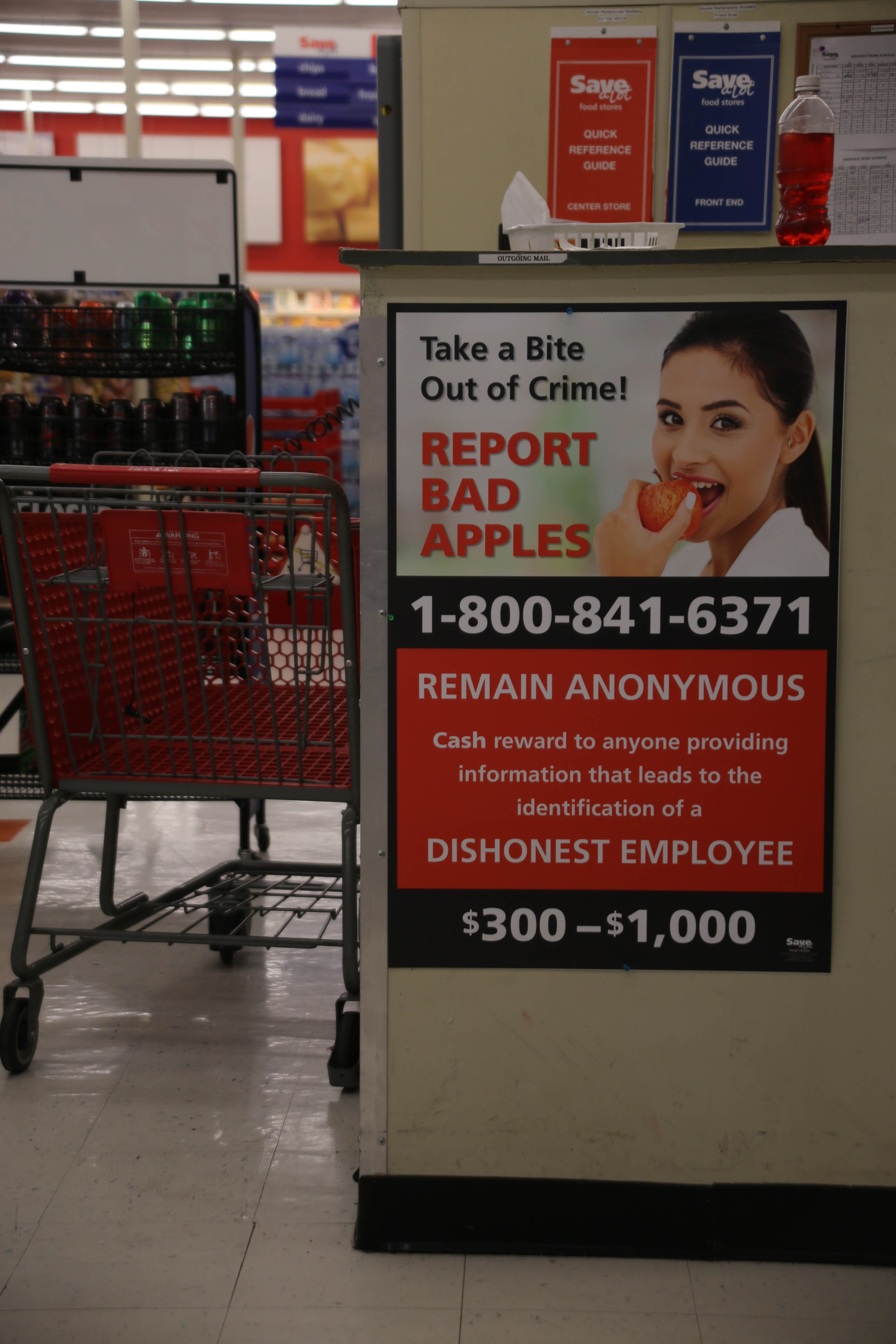
Poster in a Save-A-Lot supermarket, encouraging people to report dishonest "bad apple" staff members

=== By US presidents ===
When the US Army's war crimes at Abu Ghraib came to light, the press characterized the George W. Bush administration’s response as blaming ‘a few bad apples’ for the abuse of prisoners.

Barack Obama used the bad apple metaphor in a 2013 speech to defend his Healthcare law when thousands of Americans were losing their health insurance. He claimed that it was the fault of "bad apple" insurance companies rather than his Healthcare law.

=== Of policing ===
The bad apples metaphor has been used by pro-police politicians, municipalities, and police themselves to defend police organizations when police officers are criticized for alleged misconduct. The metaphor communicates that the few criticized officers do not reflect the performance and behavior of the rest.

Pro-police officials were first recorded as using the metaphor following the beating of Rodney King and it was used following the shootings of Michael Brown, Alton Sterling, Philando Castile, Breonna Taylor, and the murder of George Floyd. U.S. President Donald Trump used the bad apples metaphor to defend police in a Dallas speech in June 2020, claiming that there are bad apples in every organization and there remains a need for police to protect citizens. In his first presidential debate with Donald Trump on September 29, 2020, Joe Biden used the bad apples metaphor to defend policing when asked about racial inequality in terms of the justice system, claiming that the vast majority of police officers are "good, decent, honorable men and women".

Critics of policing have often rejected use of the metaphor, arguing that policing is a fundamentally broken and racist system. They claim that policing is flawed beyond repair, citing black people being disproportionately more targeted by police than white people and referencing that the police originated from slave patrols. They say that existing police forces must be abolished since attempts at reform are ineffective. A common counter metaphor used by critics such as Rashawn Ray is that the metaphorical apple tree that officers come from is rotten to its roots and must be replaced.

Anarchist author Kristian Williams claimed in his book, Our Enemies in Blue: Police and Power in America, that the bad apples argument is a way for police departments to displace blame onto a few officers to avoid criticism and actually changing as a whole.

Critics of the police also accuse officers in general of being aware of who "bad apple" officers are and being complicit with them, giving as examples the three other officers present not stopping Derek Chauvin from murdering George Floyd and 57 Buffalo officers resigning from the emergency response team as a result of two fellow officers being suspended for shoving a 75-year-old man. Harry Litman, a US attorney who has worked with police, has said that it is difficult for police departments and other officers to remove "bad apple" officers due to systematic practices protecting them, giving as an example that Derek Chauvin had 17 complaints on his record before murdering George Floyd. A study on the integrity of police by the National Institute of Justice found that, while over 80% of officers they surveyed do not believe in keeping silent when aware of misconduct by other officers, 24.9% of them agreed whistleblowing was not worth it, 67.4% of officers believe they are more likely to be given a "cold shoulder" by their police peers if they report misconduct, and 52.4% believe it is not unusual for cops to turn a blind eye to police misconduct.

== See also ==
- A.C.A.B.
- Attribution bias
- Blue Lives Matter
- Blue wall of silence
- Broken windows theory
- NotAllMen
