= The Revolutionary City =

2022 book by Mark R. Beissinger

The Revolutionary City: Urbanization and the Global Transformation of Rebellion
- Cover
- Author: Mark Beissinger
- Language: English
- Subject: Revolutions, urbanization
- Publisher: Princeton University Press
- Publication date: April 12, 2022
- Publication place: United States
- Media type: Print and digital
- Pages: 592
- Awards: Gregory Luebbert Best Book Award (2023) (Note: Co-winner with Yuhua Wang of Harvard University, Comparative Politics Section of the American Political Science Association)
- ISBN: 978-0-691-22476-3

The Revolutionary City: Urbanization and the Global Transformation of Rebellion is a 2022 book by the American political scientist Mark Beissinger.

Using a dataset of 345 revolutionary episodes worldwide between 1900 and 2014, narrative case studies, and nationally representative surveys of participants and non-participants in four contemporary revolutions, Beissinger argues that revolution, once pursued mainly through armed insurrection in cities and later from the countryside, returned to cities in the late twentieth century in a new form he calls the "urban civic" revolution, which seeks to overthrow corrupt and repressive governments by massing large unarmed crowds in central urban spaces.

Jack Goldstone described it as "perhaps the most important new book on revolutions to appear in decades," and in 2023, it was named co-winner of the Gregory Luebbert Best Book Award for the best book published over the previous two years in the field of comparative politics.

== Background, dataset, and the future of revolutions ==
Shortly after the book's American publication in April 2022, Beissinger discussed the origins of the project in an online lecture hosted by the WZB Berlin Social Science Center. He said the research began in 2010, when historians convened a workshop at Yale University on "blank spots" in the understanding of revolutions and asked him to address the relationship of violence to revolution. He recalled sharing the common assumption that revolutions had grown less deadly over time, but found that no systematic information existed to establish how much less deadly they had become, when the change had occurred, or what factors were associated with it. His initial attempts to gather such information convinced him of what a knowledge of global patterns of revolution might teach us about the ways in which populations challenge rulers from below and have these have changed over time.

In another interview with the Review of Democracy, (Note: The podcast and journal of the CEU Democracy Institute.) Beissinger said that before the dataset of 345 episodes assembled for the book, there were "no comparable global records of revolutions," and that without such information it would be impossible to know with certainty whether revolutions had been growing more frequent, less violent, or more successful over time (with “success” defined narrowly as removing the targeted regimes). He described compiling a narrative and bibliography for every episode that he examined, embedding "a qualitative strategy within a quantitative strategy." He called the four surveys "the most detailed records that we have ever had about the individuals who participated in revolutions" and allowed comparisons across a wide variety of attributes between revolutionary participants, those who supported revolution but did not participate, those opposing revolution, and those who remained apathetic, thereby providing new insights into the nature of revolutionary coalitions and of societies experiencing revolutions. Analyzing the cross-national data was complicated, he said, because revolutions are rare events involving endogenous processes for which normal statistical methods are inappropriate. For readability, he confined the details of statistical methodology to the book's appendices. The full dataset, including the statistical files used to produce the book's calculations, was made available for download from his website. At the WZB lecture, Beissinger warned against considering his model of revolutionary onset as a forecasting tool, since it had not been tested out of sample, revolution as a phenomenon has continually evolved over time, and structural models of revolution consistently over-predict rebellion. The full dataset also includes cases that, for one reason or another, fell short of Beissinger's definition of revolution, as well as robustness checks for the effects of including these cases in the statistical analyses.

Beissinger told the Review of Democracy that the consequences of revolutions are "a tremendously under-studied topic" within social science. "The work is thin, and it's an area that's ripe for research," he added. Reflecting on developments after the dataset's cut-off, he said that regimes had learned ways of countering the urban civic repertoire by dislocating protests from government nerve centers and repressing them with greater vigor. This has led to a "more volatile synthesis of the revolutionary riot and the urban civic repertoire [that] may represent the future of revolution in cities." He added that as democratic backsliding proceeds, democracies' traditional immunity to revolution may be weakening. He thought that the United States had become "much more vulnerable to revolution under Trump" and that had the January 6 riot succeeded in overturning the 2020 election, "a revolutionary response by sectors of the American public was fully conceivable."

== Summary ==
In 1905 Kyiv, then an imperial industrial center of 300,000, fell into several years of failed revolt during Russia's 1905 Revolution, involving demonstrations of up to 20 thousand, armed insurrection, mutinies, pogroms, and peasant rebellion in the surrounding countryside, as well as hundreds of deaths. By contrast, in 2004 Kyiv had become a capital of 2.5 million and produced crowds approaching a million during the Orange Revolution. After seventeen days of revolt, the government capitulated, and the single death during the Orange Revolution was from a heart attack. The two uprisings, a century apart, give the book its subject: how the concentration of people, power, and wealth in cities has changed the frequency, practice, and consequences of revolution.

Beissinger defines revolution as "a mass siege of an established government by its own population with the goals of bringing about regime-change and effecting substantive political or social change." The definition excludes military coups, electoral turnovers, and reform from above, but revolutions can be put to multiple purposes and can hybridize with other forms of regime-change. His unit of analysis is the revolutionary episode, successful (i.e., resulting in the removal of the targeted regime) or failed. For evidence, he assembled a dataset of 345 such episodes from 1900 to 2014, each with at least a thousand civilian participants. (Note: The data were compiled based on an examination of thousands of sources that are detailed in the data description, located on the author’s website. For a detailed review of the dataset, see Adam E. Casey, "Measuring Revolutions," APSA-CP Newsletter, vol. 32, 1 (Spring 2022), pp. 21-23.) He paired it with narrative case histories and with nationally representative surveys from four revolutions: Ukraine's Orange Revolution of 2004 and Euromaidan of 2013–2014, and the Tunisian and Egyptian revolutions of 2010–2011.

Theoretically, Beissinger builds the book around what he calls the proximity dilemma, which he likens to the spatial trade-off within evolutionary biology between individual growth and predation risk. Cities are where a state's nerve centers sit and its coercive power is thickest. Revolutionaries operating close to power can disrupt a regime most directly, but they are also most exposed to its repression. Distance buys safety at the cost of leverage. As a result, urban revolutions tend to be compact affairs occurring within days and weeks, while rural revolutions stretch over years. He reads the modern history of revolution as an evolutionary process, as largescale social, political, economic, and technological change influence the nature of this trade-off, and regimes and oppositions manage the consequences. Through the early twentieth century, revolution was largely an urban armed affair, fought from barricades but usually defeated by better-armed states. From the 1920s onward, social revolutionaries traded disruptive capacity for safety and moved to the countryside, where they discovered the peasantry as a revolutionary force. The pivot was the Chinese Communists' retreat from the cities after 1927. By the late twentieth century, urbanization, land reform, and the end of the Cold War were dissolving the agrarian-bureaucratic order that, according to Skocpol, had sustained peasant social revolutions, which, Beissinger shows, went into sharp decline. But in the late twentieth century, revolution returned to the city in new guise: the urban civic revolution, an unarmed uprising that assembles as many people as possible into central squares and boulevards, paralyzing government and commerce through the power of numbers. Since 1985, urban civic revolutions have made up about two-fifths of revolutionary episodes worldwide, and their spread accounts for an overall rise in revolutionary activity around the world (from 2.44 new episodes per year in the first half of the twentieth century to 4.10 per year between 1985 and 2014).

Urban civic revolutions break out under conditions unlike those that foster the social revolutions of the twentieth century: not poverty and land inequality but middle-income economies, closed and personalist regimes, high executive corruption, and leaders long in office. Earlier theorists likened revolutions to earthquakes or wildfires; Beissinger proposes the hurricane, a storm that forms mostly where structural conditions favor it but develops contingently out of the interactions between regimes and oppositions. Once underway, urban civic revolts have overthrown regimes more often than other forma of revolution. However, only very large crowds tip the odds in favor of oppositions, and the violence that serves rural insurgencies backfires in cities, where there is no place to hide. This drives urban civic revolutions to seek to maximize numbers by pulling in all who oppose the regime, irrespective of policy preferences. This has been greatly facilitated by the emergence of digital media as a vehicle for mobilizing large numbers. Moreover, because they unfold over days or weeks rather than years, urban revolutions compress decision-making, magnify the effects of error and rumor, and turn contention into a struggle for control over public space; success is strongly associated with mobilization near the seat of government. Separate chapters of the book illustrate these interactive and spatial dynamics.

Using the surveys, Beissinger shows that participants in urban civic revolutions are disproportionately educated and middle class, more politically diverse than either supporters or opponents of revolution, and united at the moment of revolt in a “negative coalition” againstthe ruling regime over a variety of grievances (most prominently, corruption, economic issues, and repression). Accordingly, Beissinger argues that these revolutions are better understood as revolutions "against repressive and abusive government" than revolutions for democracy. A chapter on violence charts the steep fall in revolutionary mortality from its mid-century peak, as civil wars shortened, contention moved to the cities, and states adopted less lethal crowd-control technology, even as rural counterinsurgency grew deadlier.

Using cross-national data of developments following revolutions, Beissinger shows that regimes born of urban civic revolutions bring gains in political freedoms and government accountability, but in both areas fall short of the average electoral democracy. They inherit the old state apparatus largely intact, including its widespread corruption. On average, economic growth turns sluggish, they are accompanied by greater inequality, and they remain in power less-than-half as long as regimes produced by social revolutions. These consequences, he argues, to a large extent are the products of the urban civic model, which, in its desire to maximize numbers, rapidly assembles, in a makeshift manner, “all who favor the removal of the incumbent regime, irrespective of purpose."

In his conclusion, Beissinger shows that success rates for urban civic revolutions fell sharply after 2014 as governments learned to counter the repertoire through spatial control, digital surveillance, and greater violence. He expects a more riotous revolutionary futurein cities. Revolution as a mode of regime-change is not disappearing but evolving. The book ends by quoting Yevgeny Zamyatin: "there is no such thing as the 'last' revolution; the number of revolutions is infinite."

== Awards ==
- The Luebbert Best Book Award (2023) for the best book published over the previous two years in the field of comparative politics

== Reviews ==
Jack Goldstone called the work "perhaps the most important new book on revolutions to appear in decades." The analysis ranges from global data to cases in South Korea, the Middle East, Europe, and Latin America, a mastery of the material he described as "stunning." He linked the findings to Erica Chenoweth and Maria Stephan's work on civil resistance. They found that nonviolent civic revolutions change regimes more often and do less damage than violent social revolutions, but as Beissinger finds, they often struggle with weak coalitions, persistent corruption, and policy paralysis, and their gains may prove short-lived as regimes learn new methods of control. "As a rigorous, data-driven study of revolution around the world and across the last century," he wrote, "this book has no peer."

Fourth-generation scholarship on revolution, in Henry Thomson's account, had drifted since the Cold War toward the agency of activists and the contingency of events; the book puts a structural force, global urbanization, back at the center of that literature. He called it a "path-breaking study" and predicted that scholars would build on it extensively. Its most significant empirical contribution, in his view, is the original dataset of 345 revolutionary episodes from 1900 to 2014: revolution grows steadily more frequent across the period and less lethal after mid-century, and urban civic revolutions, the mass, largely nonviolent campaigns for democratization that account for roughly 40 percent of episodes since 1985, topple governments at higher rates than earlier movements. Thomson, whose own research concerns state repression, argued that scholars should next examine how urbanization shapes authoritarian coercive institutions, since surveillance technology and the design of security forces also set the risks of protesting near the centers of power, and regimes adapt to the very successes the book measures. His example of such learning was China, where the People's Armed Police, expanded sharply after the 1989 Tiananmen protests, suppressed urban demonstrations against COVID-19 policies within days in late 2022.

The book's most dramatic finding, Sidney Tarrow wrote, is that successful urban revolutions are shorter-lived than successful agrarian ones: they inherit structures and practices, including corruption, from the governments they replace, and rest on coalitions assembled in haste. He called Beissinger's blend of case-study and quantitative material "a signal achievement." Urban insurgents have direct access to the centers of power but, unlike rural rebels, have nowhere to retreat; Tarrow found the chapter on this repression–disruption trade-off "a triumph of mixed-mechanism analysis." He conceded it was not an easy book to criticize; his three objections all bore on the line between agrarian social and urban civic revolution. The movement that brought Mussolini to power in 1922 drew its shock force from the Po Valley countryside, but its goal was to displace Italy's parliamentary democracy; the 1905 Russian revolution began when a peaceful bread protest was put down in St. Petersburg but contained a massive peasant revolt; and Tunisia's uprising started in the hinterland over socio-economic grievances and turned urban and civic only as it neared the capital. For Tarrow these were cavils: Beissinger had written "a peak career book" and joined Barrington Moore, Charles Tilly, and Theda Skocpol among the major scholars of revolution.

Jeff Goodwin described it as an ambitious and well written study, "empirically rich and theoretically disappointing" all the same. The claim that social revolutions died out with agrarian-bureaucratic society, he maintained, rested on a misreading of Theda Skocpol, who, according to Goodwin, never thought that setting as a necessary or sufficient cause of social revolution. The spatial theory went only so far: it explained why large, unarmed crowds succeeded, not why anyone gathered in the first place or why the demand was the fall of the regime rather than its reform. Four of the six structural conditions behind the new revolts concerned regime type, which he read as support for a state-centered account of revolution (similar to what Goodwin has advocated) rather than a spatial one. Against the forecast that the age of social revolution had ended, he maintained that a future urban revolution with radically redistributive aims could not be ruled out. In fact, in the conclusion to the book, Beissinger raises just such a possibility.

Idlir Lika called Beissinger's dataset the "one and only" global record of revolutions in the scholarship (though other analogous datasets have subsequently appeared). (Note: For a review of several of these datasets, see Guseinov, Ruslan, Vadim Ustyuzhanin, and Andrey Korotayev. "Talking about the [same] revolution? A comparative analysis of main datasets of revolutionary events." Defence and Peace Economics (2026): 1-31.) The statistical inference that it makes possible was for him a major advance in evidence and method in a field long dominated by comparative histories of a few paradigmatic cases. Lika largely objected to the case material: Beissinger presents it as the study's qualitative side, but it relies almost entirely on secondary sources and mostly lacks in-depth process tracing of causal mechanisms based on primary sources. Explaining why violence varies so widely among urban civic revolutions themselves, one death in Ukraine's Orange Revolution against at least 121 in Euromaidan a decade later, would have required controlled comparisons of a few cases grounded in primary sources. Structure, he found, plays a heavier role in the account than agency; among structural factors, the end of American unipolarity and the shift toward a multipolar order, touched on only briefly, might be among the main determinants of revolution's future. Still, Lika rated the book "an impressive achievement" in both scope and argument, and "definitely the most comprehensive global study of revolutions to date."

In an essay that sets it beside works by Erica Chenoweth, Atef Said, and Deva Woodly, George Lawson called the book "monumental": a study of revolution's shift from countryside to city across more than a century. Beissinger's dataset runs to 345 revolutionary episodes, Chenoweth's to 627 “maximalist episodes” over nearly the same period, and the two share almost no definitions, not even of revolution. Civil wars and secessionist movements fall inside Beissinger's definition, which makes the study "highly inclusive, but at the cost of specification" Though Beissinger does not treat revolution homogenously and does examine different forms and manifestations of revolution, macropatterns and average effects leave events on the ground out of view, and international dynamics get little space. Beissinger declares the era of social revolutions (as social revolution manifested itself historically) over; for Lawson, that holds only if right-wing movements are taken not to wage class struggle, a premise he found debatable.

Alexei Anisin found most of the book's claims plausible and its data transparent and public. One, he believed, was "highly contestable": that the broad, mixed coalitions of urban civic revolution turn into a liability once the regime falls, and that recent uprisings run on grievances against corrupt and unfair leaders more than on democratic aims. Recent civil resistance studies cut the other way and link nonviolent campaigns to associational capacity and later democratization. The data stop at 2014, and the past decade's string of failed urban uprisings are uncounted in the study. Forms and foci may change, but the city stays "a critical arena for political change." Whether revolution remains as peaceful as it has become, Anisin left open.

Fouad Mami wrote that the book's charts and tables may intimidate some readers, but repay the reader's effort. For him, its quantitative findings convincingly explain why post-revolutionary Tunisia, Egypt, and Libya remain stuck. Urban uprisings move too fast for either side to see ahead, and mistakes harden into irreversible consequences. He says that policymakers, democracy activists, and scholars of social movements would find the book rewarding. Definitions of terms such as "coupvolution" stay deliberately sparse, which at times "sacrifices complexity for smooth theoretical application." Revolutions and counter-revolutions can look alike, depending on who does the reporting and to what end. And the sharp break between social and urban civic revolution could serve counter-revolutionaries as an argument against carrying out "unfinished emancipations."

For Nicholas Lees, the dataset was the greatest contribution of the project, though some of its findings paralleled those of the Nonviolent and Violent Campaigns and Outcomes project. He liked the pairing of statistics with case studies chosen where the model predicted well or badly, and warned that the econometrics would test untrained readers. Whether rural and urban revolutions were even the same political process seemed to him an open question. He called it "a landmark study that is sure to generate a new wave of scholarship", though perhaps the study of a passing phase.

The account of how urbanization transformed rebellion struck Egor D. Fain and Alisa R. Shishkina as "really systemic and compelling." Its scope answered a complaint as old as the field itself, the shortage of cases, and the analysis moved between global trends and single local events without strain. They ranked it among the studies able to constitute a new fifth generation of revolution theory.
