= Stanford Graduate School of Business =

Business school of Stanford University

Coordinates: 37.4280°N 122.1612°W

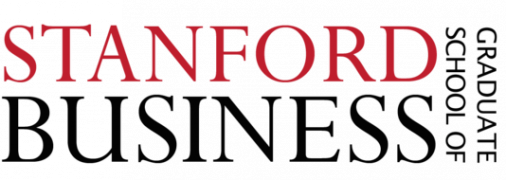
- Motto: Change Lives.; Change Organizations.; Change the World.
- Type: Private graduate business school
- Established: 1925
- Parent institution: Stanford University
- Accreditation: AACSB International
- Dean: Sarah Soule
- Faculty: 114
- Postgraduates: 816 MBAs, 83 MSs, and 101 PhDs in residence
- Other students: 2,284 (Executive education)
- Location: Stanford, California, United States
- Campus: Suburban
- Nickname: Stanford GSB
- Website: www.gsb.stanford.edu

The Stanford Graduate School of Business is the graduate business school of Stanford University, a private research university in Stanford, California. Stanford GSB offers a general management Master of Business Administration (MBA) degree, the MSx Program (MS in Management for mid-career executives), Stanford LEAD Online Business Program and a PhD program, along with joint degrees with other schools at Stanford, including Earth Sciences, Education, Engineering, Law, and Medicine.

== History ==
The school was founded in 1925 when trustee Herbert Hoover formed a committee consisting of Wallace Alexander, George Rolph, Paul Shoup, Thomas Gregory, and Milton Esberg to secure the needed funds for the school's founding. Willard Hotchkiss became the first dean of Stanford GSB.

The library was formally inaugurated on April 3, 1933. The collection was established with 1,000 volumes and assorted reports. The school moved from Jordan Hall to new quarters in the History Corner of the Main Quad in 1937.

Jonathan Levin was appointed as the 10th dean of the school in September 2016. Levin became the 13th president of Stanford University on August 1, 2024. Sarah Soule was appointed the new dean of the business school in January 2025.

== Campus ==
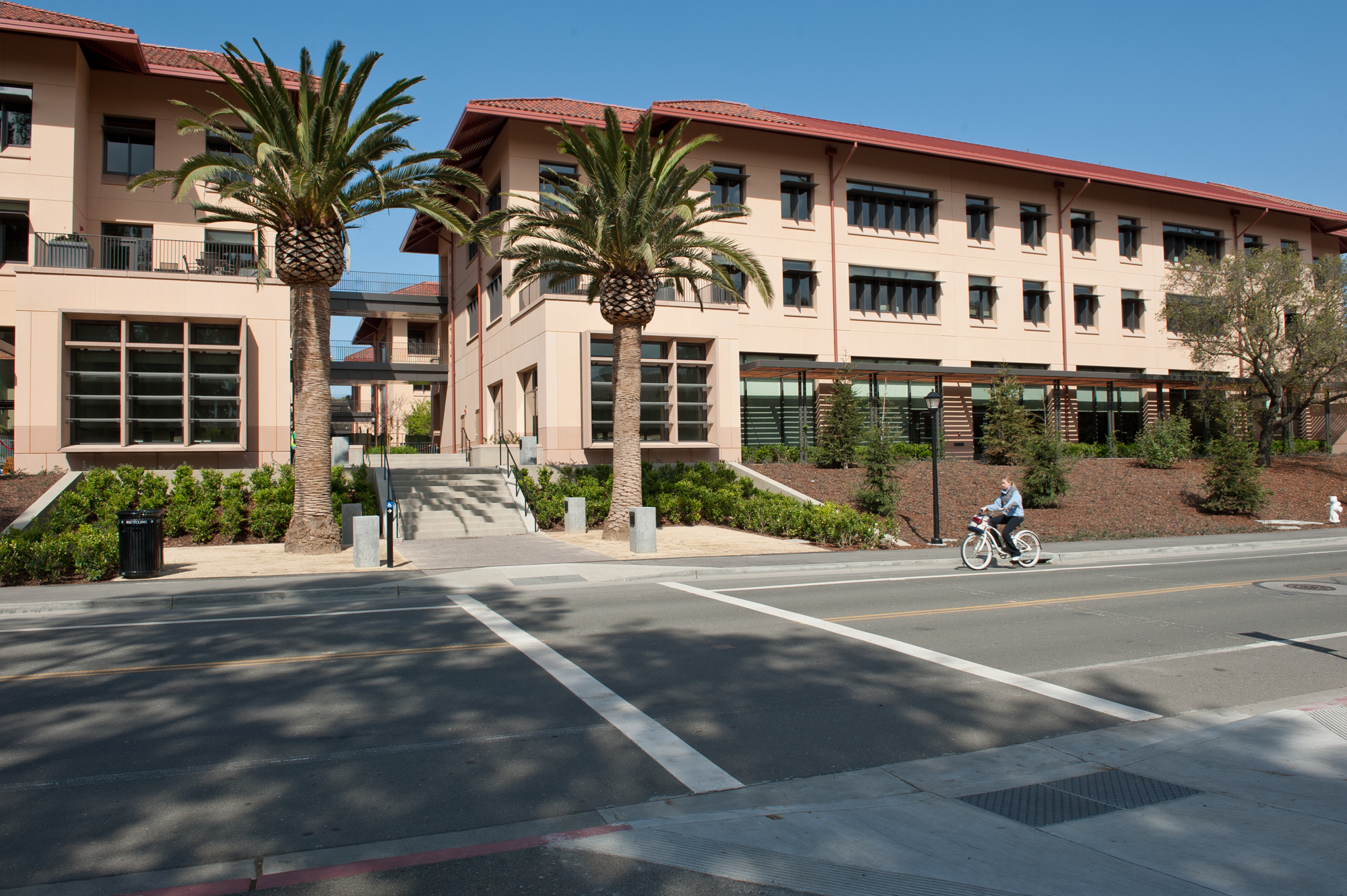
Stanford Knight Management Center, seen from Jane Stanford Way.

The Knight Management Center is situated within the greater Stanford campus. There are ten buildings at the Knight Management Center: the Gunn Building, Zambrano Hall, North Building, Arbuckle Dining Pavilion, Bass Center, the Faculty Buildings (comprising East and West buildings), the Patterson Building, the MBA Class of 1968 Building, and the McClelland Building.

The Schwab Residential Center was designed by Mexican architect Ricardo Legorreta. The 158,000 square-foot facility consists of 280 guest rooms. Jack McDonald Hall, located adjacent to Schwab, opened in 2016 as an additional residence for MBA students with over 200 guest rooms.

There are three main art installations on campus, including Monument to Change as it Changes, Monument to the Unknown Variables, and Ways to Change.

Stanford GSB maintains very close links with the venture capital, finance and technology firms of nearby Silicon Valley.

== Academics ==
Stanford GSB offers a traditional Master of Business Administration (MBA) program typically completed in two years, a Master of Science ("MSx program") typically completed in one year, and a doctoral (PhD) program. The MBA program is a full-time graduate program that enrolls approximately 420 students each year.

The MSx program is intended for students who are mid-career managers (minimum 8 years of professional work experience). The Stanford MSx was previously called the Stanford Sloan Master's Program, because students in the program are known as Stanford Sloan Fellows. The Stanford MSx is one of the three Sloan Fellows programs, sharing a similar format with the others at the MIT Sloan School of Management and the London Business School. These programs were initially supported by Alfred P. Sloan, Chairman of General Motors from 1937 to 1956, who envisioned the Sloan Fellowship in his alma mater of MIT in 1931.

=== Academic partnerships ===
Stanford GSB offers Executive Education programs jointly with Harvard Business School. It also offers one of the three Sloan Fellows programs, coordinating with the others at the MIT Sloan School of Management and the London Business School.

=== Stanford LEAD Professional Certificate ===
The Stanford LEAD Business Program (LEAD is an acronym for learn, engage, accelerate, and disrupt) is a one-year online business program in the Graduate School of Business offering access to curricular materials and students specialize personal leadership. The teaching components are coordinated 100% online although there are periodic meet-ups hosted at Stanford each year through the me2we program. The annual me2we conferences have grown to become quite large, and the program's 1,800 LEAD alumni can join remotely.

== Faculty and research ==
The school works at the forefront of global business research and teaching. There are six winners of the Nobel Memorial Prize in Economic Sciences on the faculty (William F. Sharpe 1990, Myron Scholes 1997, Michael Spence 2001, Paul Milgrom 2020, Robert B. Wilson 2020, Guido Imbens 2021), five recipients of the John Bates Clark Award, 19 members of the American Academy of Arts and Sciences, and four members of the National Academy of Sciences.

William F. Sharpe's research interests focus on macro-investment analysis, equilibrium in capital markets and the provision of income in retirement. Myron Scholes' research has focused on understanding uncertainty and its effect on asset prices and the value of options, including flexibility options. Michael Spence's research interests focus on the study of economic growth and development, dynamic competition and the economics of information.

== Rankings ==
Business school rankings

United States
- QS MBA: 3
- Financial Times MBA: 15
- Bloomberg MBA: 1
- USNWR MBA: 1
- THE Business: 2

Global
- QS MBA: 3
- Financial Times MBA: 23
- THE Business: 2

In recent rankings, Stanford GSB was ranked 1st by Bloomberg Businessweek, 1st by QS World University Rankings, and 1st by U.S. News & World Report. In the ranking aggregator Poets & Quants Stanford's MBA Program was ranked 1st in the U.S. In the inaugural LinkedIn MBA rankings (2024), Stanford was ranked #1 globally.

The Stanford Graduate School of Business is the most selective business school in the United States. It has maintained the highest ratio of "applicants to available seats" of any business school in the U.S. for the last decade. It has also had the lowest acceptance rates (typically <7%) of any business school. For the Class of 2022 which entered in 2020, 8% of applicants were offered admission, and the average GMAT score of 733 and average GPA of 3.8 are the highest of any business school in the world.

The business school comprises the Knight Management Center, the Schwab Residential Center named after alumnus Charles R. Schwab, founder and chairman of the Charles Schwab Corporation, and Highland Hall.

== Donations ==
Schwab Residential Center

In August 2006, the school announced what was then the largest gift ever to a business school—$105 million from Stanford alumnus Phil Knight, MBA '62, co-founder and chairman of Nike, Inc. The gift went toward construction of a $375 million campus, called the Knight Management Center, for the business school. Construction was completed in 2011.

In 2011, alumnus Robert King and his wife Dorothy made a $150 million gift to the school—making history as the largest donation to Stanford GSB—to found the Institute for Innovation in Developing Economies (also known as Stanford Seed) to focus on poverty relief in emerging markets. A portion of their gift is used as a matching incentive to encourage other donors to give to Seed.

The gifts by King and Knight are marked as the second and third largest philanthropic pledges to a business school.

== Alumni ==
There are 33,689 living alumni, including 21,111 living MBA alumni. MBA alumni include 23 billionaires and several heads of state.

== See also ==
- List of business schools in the United States
- List of United States business school rankings
