= Mark Beissinger =

American political scientist

- Born: November 28, 1954 (age 71); Philadelphia, Pennsylvania
- Occupation: Political scientist

Academic background
- Education: Duke University (BA); Harvard University (PhD)

Academic work
- Discipline: Comparative politics Contentious politics
- Institutions: Princeton University (2006–present) University of Wisconsin–Madison (1988–2006) Harvard University (1982–1987)
- Main interests: Social movements and contentious politics, nationalism, statebuilding, post-communist politics

Mark R. Beissinger (November 28, 1954) is an American political scientist. He is the Henry W. Putnam Professor of Politics at Princeton University.

== Early life ==
Beissinger was born on November 28, 1954 in Philadelphia, Pennsylvania.

Beissinger received his bachelor's degree in political science magna cum laude from Duke University in 1976 and his doctorate in political science from Harvard in 1982.

== Career ==
He taught at Harvard's Government department from 1982 until 1987, and at the University of Wisconsin–Madison, from 1988 until 2006. He served as chair of the UW-Madison Political Science Department from 2001 to 2004 and was the founding director of Wisconsin's Center for Russia, East Europe, and Central Asia.

Since 2006 he has taught at Princeton University as a full professor. He served as director of the Princeton Institute for International and Regional Studies. In 2007 he was president of the Association for Slavic, East European, and Eurasian Studies (ASEEES).

His work has been supported by fellowships and grants from the John Simon Guggenheim Memorial Foundation, the Institute for Advanced Study at Princeton, the Wissenshaftskolleg zu Berlin, the Woodrow Wilson International Center for Scholars, the National Science Foundation, and the John M. Olin Foundation.

== Works ==
He is author of the books The Revolutionary City: Urbanization and the Global Transformation of Rebellion (2022), Nationalist Mobilization and the Collapse of the Soviet State (2002), and Scientific Management, Socialist Discipline, and Soviet Power (1988), and co-edited The Nationalities Factor in Soviet Politics and Society (1990, with Lubomyr Hajda), Beyond State Crisis? Post-Colonial Africa and Post-Soviet Eurasia Compared (2002, with M. Crawford Young), and Historical Legacies of Communism in Russia and Eastern Europe (2014, with Stephen Kotkin).

== Recognition ==
- 2023 Luebbert Best Book Award for the best book published in the field of comparative politics over the previous two years, presented by the Comparative Politics section of the American Political Science Association.
- 2017 Guggenheim Fellowship.
- 2003 Woodrow Wilson Foundation Award for the best book on government, politics, or international affairs
- 2003 Mattei Dogan Award presented by the Society for Comparative Research for the best book published in the field of comparative research
- Award for Best Book on European Politics presented by the Organized Section on European Politics and Society of the American Political Science Association.
