= Sarah Soule =

American sociologist

11th Dean of Stanford Graduate School of Business
- Incumbent
- Assumed office June 16, 2025
- President: Jonathan Levin
- Preceded by: Jonathan Levin

Personal details
- Education: University of Vermont (B.A.); Cornell University (M.A., Ph.D.)

Academic background
- Thesis: The student anti-apartheid movement in the United States : diffusion of protest tactics and policy reform (1995)

Sarah Anne Soule is an American sociologist who is the Philip H. Knight Professor and Dean at Stanford Graduate School of Business and the Morgridge Professor of Organizational Behavior and director of the Center for Advanced Study in the Behavioral Sciences at Stanford University. She is known for her work on organizational behavior, social movements, political sociology, and policy change and diffusion.

== Education and career ==
Soule studied Sociology and Political Science at the University of Vermont, receiving her B.A. in 1989. She completed both her M.A. in Sociology in 1991 and Ph.D. in Sociology in 1995 at Cornell University. She started her professional academic career at the University of Arizona in 1995, and was promoted to professor by 2005. After briefly working at Cornell University, she started as a professor at Stanford University in 2008. In 2009 she was promoted to the position of Morgridge Professor of Organizational Behavior, and 2016 she was named senior associate dean for academic affairs at Stanford Graduate School of Business. In 2023 she was named director of the Center for Advanced Study in the Behavioral Sciences at Stanford. In 2025 she was appointed dean of the Stanford Graduate School of Business.

== Research ==
Soule's research focuses on organizational behavior, social movements, political sociology, and policy change and diffusion. Her book, Contention and Corporate Social Responsibility, looks at the role of social movements and activism in corporate action and social accountability. She has spoken about the increase in politics in the workspace in the United States, and establishing a business program designed to increase the presence of LGBT people in business leadership.

== Selected publications ==
- Soule, Sarah A. (1997). "The Student Divestment Movement in the United States and Tactical Diffusion: The Shantytown Protest". Social Forces. 75 (3): 855–882. doi:10.2307/2580522. JSTOR 2580522.
- Strang, David; Soule, Sarah A. (1998). "Diffusion in Organizations and Social Movements: From Hybrid Corn to Poison Pills". Annual Review of Sociology. 24 (1): 265–290. doi:10.1146/annurev.soc.24.1.265. ISSN 0360-0572.
- Snow, David A.; Soule, Sarah A.; Kriesi, Hanspeter (2008-04-15). The Blackwell Companion to Social Movements. John Wiley & Sons. ISBN 978-0-470-99909-7.
- Soule, Sarah A. (2009). Contention and Corporate Social Responsibility. Cambridge Studies in Contentious Politics. Cambridge: Cambridge University Press. ISBN 978-0-521-89840-9.
