= Social movement theory =

Interdisciplinary social study

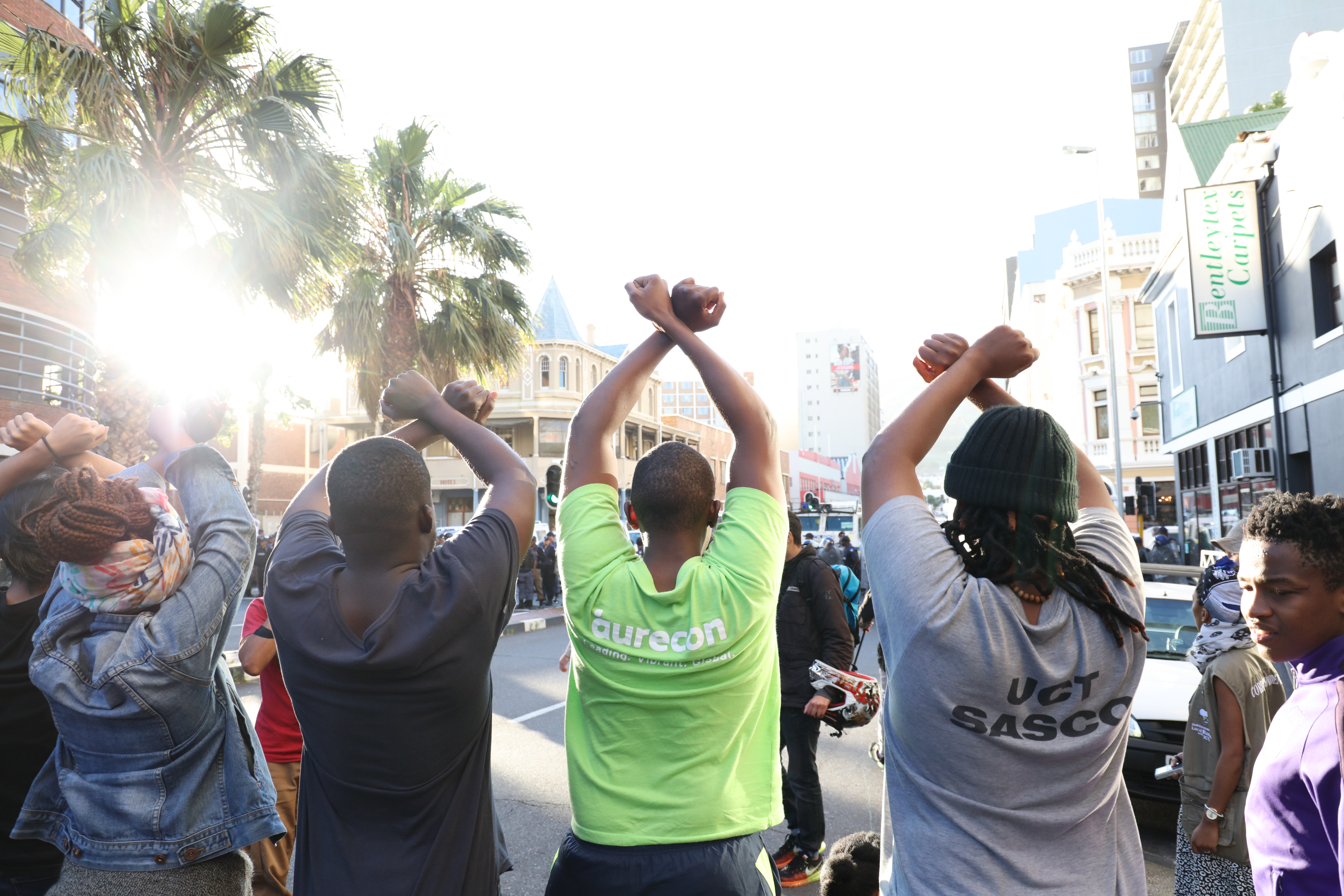
A group of students raise their hands in the air to signal that they have come in peace, as part of the 2015–2016 student protests against university fee increases in South Africa.

Social movement theory is an interdisciplinary study within the social sciences that generally seeks to explain why social mobilization occurs, the forms under which it manifests, as well as potential social, cultural, political, and economic consequences, such as the creation and functioning of social movements.

== Classical approaches ==
The classical approaches emerged at the turn of the century. These approaches have in common that they rely on the same causal mechanism. The sources of social movements are structural strains. These are structural weaknesses in society that put individuals under a certain subjective psychological pressure, such as unemployment, rapid industrialization or urbanization. When the psychological disturbance reaches a certain threshold, this tension will produce a disposition to participate in unconventional means of political participation, such as protesting. Additionally, these approaches have in common that they view participation in contentious politics as unconventional and irrational, because the protests are the result of an emotional and frustrated reaction to grievances rather than a rational attempt to improve their situation. These psychologically-based theories have largely been rejected by present-day sociologists and political scientists, although many still make a case for the importance (although not centrality) of emotions. See the work of Gustav LeBon, Herbert Blumer, William Kornhauser, and Neil Smelser.

=== Deindividuation model ===
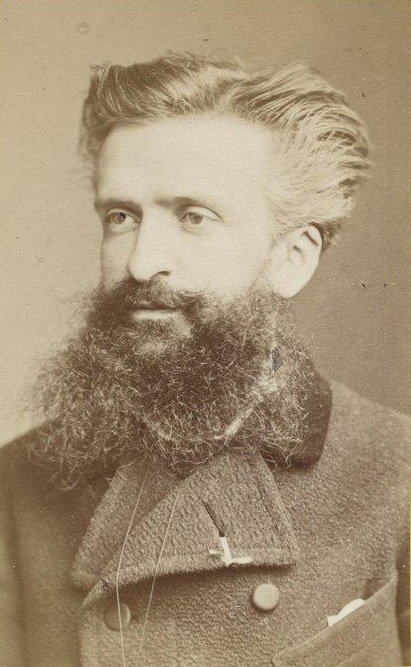
Gustave Le Bon, an early social scientist who studied social movements

Sociologists during the early and middle-1900s thought that movements were random occurrences of individuals who were trying to emotionally react to situations outside their control.

Leon Festinger was an American social psychologist who coined the term deindividuation. Festinger and colleagues suggested that experiencing deindividuation, especially within a group setting, diminishes typical inhibitions on behavior, leading individuals to engage in actions they might otherwise refrain from, as they feel less directly responsible for their conduct.

An important writer in this area of research was Gustave LeBon. In his book The Crowd, he studied the collective behavior of crowds. What he concluded was that once an individual submerges in a crowd, his behavior becomes primitive and irrational and he is therefore capable of spontaneous violence. This transformation happens under certain conditions. Once individuals submerge themselves in a crowd, they gain a sense of anonymity and this causes them to believe that they cannot be held accountable for their behavior within the crowd. This is combined with a sense of invisibility by being part of a crowd. Under these conditions, critical reasoning is impossible and an unconscious personality emerges: a personality which is dominated by destructive instincts and primitive beliefs. This theory has been picked up and further developed by other theorists like Herbert Blumer and Neil Smelser.

=== Mass society theory ===
Mass society theory emerged in the wake of the fascist and communist movements in the 1930s and 1940s and can be seen as an attempt to explain the rise of extremism abroad. One prime example of extremism abroad is the rise of fascism in Europe during the twentieth century. Characterized by totalitarian rule, nationalist fervor, and racial discrimination, fascist regimes such as those led by Mussolini in Italy and Hitler in Germany imposed authoritarian control and propagated aggressive expansionism.

The central claim of mass society theory is that socially isolated people are more vulnerable to extremism.

An important underpinning of this theory is Émile Durkheim's analysis of modern society and the rise of individualism. Durkheim stated that the emergence of the industrial society caused two problems:

- Anomie: There were insufficient ways to regulate behavior due to the increasing size and complexity of the modern society.
- Egoism: The excessive individuation of people due to the weakening of local communities.

These problems signify a weakened restraining social network to control the behavior of individuals. According to Durkheim, this will lead to dysfunctional behavior, such as suicide.

Arthur Kornhauser applied this theory to social movements in his book The Politics of Mass Society. He stated that in a mass society, anomie and egoism cause small local groups and networks to decline. What is left after this are powerful elites, massive bureaucracies, and isolated individuals. In this society, intermediate buffers between the elite and the non-elite erode and normal channels for non-elites to influence elites become ineffective. This makes non-elites feel more alienated, and therefore more susceptible to extremism.

=== Relative deprivation ===
People are driven into movements out of a sense of deprivation or inequality, particularly (1) in relation to others or (2) in relation to their expectations. In the first view, participants see others who have more power, economic resources, or status, and thus try to acquire these same things for themselves. In the second view, people are most likely to rebel when a consistently improving situation (especially an improving economy) stops and makes a turn for the worse. At this point, people will join movements because their expectations will have outgrown their actual material situation (also called the "J-Curve theory"). See the work of James Davies, Ted Gurr, and Denton Morrison.

== Contemporary approaches ==
During the 1960s there was a growth in the amount of social movement activity in both Europe and the United States. With this increase also came a change in the public perception around social movements. Protests were now seen as making politics better and essential for a healthy democracy. The classical approaches were not able to explain this increase in social movements. Because the core principle of these approaches was that protests were held by people who were suffering from structural weaknesses in society, it could not explain that the growth in social movement was preceded by a growth in welfare rather than a decline in welfare. Therefore, there was a need for new theoretical approaches.

Because deprivation was not a viable explanation anymore, researchers needed to search for another explanation. The explanations that were developed were different in the United States than in Europe. The more American-centered structural approaches examined how characteristics of the social and political context enable or hinder protests. The more European-centered social-constructivist approaches rejected the notion that class-struggle is central to social movements, and emphasized other indicators of a collective identity, like gender, ethnicity or sexuality.

=== Structural approaches ===
==== Political opportunity/political process ====
Certain political contexts should be conducive for potential social movement activity. There are two important approaches structuralist and constructivist. The main difference between the structuralist and constructivist approaches through communication is that constructivism focuses on more communication. Structuralism is more centered around the consequences of human interaction. These climates may [dis]favor specific social movements or general social movement activity; the climate may be signaled to potential activists and/or structurally allowing for the possibility of social movement activity (matters of legality); and the political opportunities may be realized through political concessions, social movement participation, or social movement organizational founding. Opportunities may include:

1. Increased access to political decision making power
2. Instability in the alignment of ruling elites (or conflict between elites)
3. Access to elite allies (who can then help a movement in its struggle)
4. Declining capacity and propensity of the state to repress dissent

==== Resource mobilization ====
Social movements need organizations first and foremost. Organizations can acquire and then deploy resources to achieve their well-defined goals. To predict the likelihood that the preferences of a certain group in society will turn into protest, these theorists look at the pre-existing organization of this group. When the population related to a social movement is already highly organized, they are more likely to create organized forms of protest because a higher organization makes it easier to mobilize the necessary resources. A states policing strategy (repression or reform) can constrain or expand an organizations ability to deploy or use their resources. For example, harsh policing could strengthen moral resources and in turn strengthen cultural resources, bolstering a social movement. Some versions of this theory state that movements operate similar to capitalist enterprises that make efficient use of available resources. Scholars have suggested a typology of five types of resources:

1. Material (money and physical capital);
2. Morale (solidarity, support for the movement's goals);
3. Social-Organizational (organizational strategies, social networks, bloc recruitment);
4. Human (volunteers, staff, leaders);
5. Cultural (prior activist experience, understanding of the issues, collective action know-how)

Political Process Theory

Political Process Theory explores how movements arise and succeed through analyzing political opportunity structures, resource access, and collective identity formation. This theory emphasizes the interaction between marginalized groups and their political environment, by focusing on openings in power structures that allow for the advancement of movements. McFarland discusses how power dynamics and institutional responsiveness determine if grievances evolve into organized action. This theory underscores the importance of framing, alliances and political vulnerabilities, arguing that movements often thrive when exploiting a shift in power or norms.

==== Social movement impact theory ====
This body of work focuses on assessing the impact that a social movement has on society, and what factors might have led to those impacts. The effects of a social movement can resonate on individuals, institutions, cultures, or political systems. While political impacts have been studied the most, effects on other levels can be at least as important. Because Impact Theory has many methodological issues, it is the least studied of the major branches of Social Movement Theory. Nevertheless, it has sparked debates on the efficacy of violence, the importance of elite and political allies, and the agency of popular movements in general.

=== Social-constructivist approaches ===
==== New social movements ====
This European-influenced group of theories argue that movements today are categorically different from the ones in the past. Instead of labor movements engaged in class conflict, present-day movements (such as anti-war, environmental, civil rights, feminist, etc.) are engaged in social and political conflict (see Alain Touraine). The motivations for movement participation is a form of post-material politics and newly created identities, particularly those from the "new middle class". Also, see the work of Ronald Inglehart, Jürgen Habermas, Alberto Melucci, and Steve Buechler. This line of research has stimulated an enduring emphasis on identity even among prominent American scholars like Charles Tilly.

==== 1990s social-movement studies ====
In the late 1990s two long books summarized the cultural turn in social-movement studies, Alberto Melucci's Challenging Codes and James M. Jasper's The Art of Moral Protest. Melucci focused on the creation of collective identities as the purpose of social movements, especially the "new social movements", whereas Jasper argued that movements provide participants with a chance to elaborate and articulate their moral intuitions and principles. Both recognized the importance of emotions in social movements, although Jasper developed this idea more systematically. Along with Jeff Goodwin and Francesca Polletta, Jasper organized a conference in New York in 1999 that helped put emotions on the intellectual agenda for many scholars of protest and movements. He has continued to write about the emotional dynamics of protest in the years since.

In 1999, Goodwin and Jasper published a critique of the then-dominant political opportunity paradigm, using Jasper's cultural approach to show that political opportunity was too structural as a concept, leaving out meanings, emotions, and agency. Charles Tilly and a number of other scholars responded, often vituperatively.

In The Art of Moral Protest Jasper also argued that strategic interaction had an important logic that was independent of both culture and structure, and in 2006 he followed up on this claim with Getting Your Way: Strategic Dilemmas in Real Life, which developed a vocabulary for studying strategic engagement in a cultural, emotional, and agentic way. By then, his theory of action had moved closer to pragmatism and symbolic interactionism. In the same period, Wisconsin social theorist Mustafa Emirbayer had begun writing in a similar fashion about emotions and social movements, but more explicitly deriving his ideas from the history of sociological thought. In France, Daniel Cefaï arrived at similar conclusions in Pourquoi se mobilise-t-on?, a sweeping history and synthesis of thought on collective action and social movements.

Social Media and Social Movements

Social Media's influence on social movements has been categorized into three perspectives, optimism, pessimism and ambivalence. Optimists show how platforms like Facebook and X enhance activism through a rapid spread of information and coordination. The pessimist argues that social media creates a shallow engagement that can be co-opted by an authoritarian regime under the guise of surveillance. The ambivalent view emphasizes that while social media supports communication and mobilization, real-world action is still paramount. Here Kidd and McIntosh conclude that social media is not a guaranteed tool for revolution but still plays an important role in the broad context of social movements.

- Techno-Optimism: Social media enhances mobilization by lowering barriers and bridging the online and real world.
- Techno-Pessimism: Views social media as vulnerable to state surveillance and control.
- Techno-Ambivalence: Social media can facilitate movements however, it cannot do it by itself, traditional strategies are still required.

Lopes views social media as more of a mobilizing structure that interacts with opportunity structures, such as political instability and economic decline etc. to foster social movements. Lopes data from 2008-2012 shows that internet penetration was a significant predictor of protest in the area. Lopes believed that this reduces coordination costs as well as amplifying collective action to groups that might not otherwise participate. Lopes argues that social media is a powerful catalyst, but that's about it, stating it can only function within and depend on pre-existing grievances and or institutional dynamics.

=== Frame analysis ===
Frame analysis comes from a work by Erving Goffman, Frame Analysis, in which he presents the concept of the frame of experience. These frames are the set of reading grids of the interpretive schemes that allow us to adapt to our social environment, but these schemes, these frames of experience, are learned: if the worker has not learned the frames of experience of a philanthropic association, the individual will therefore be helpless in the interaction.

== Postcolonial critique ==
Recent years have seen the rise of postcolonial critique, which hails from the larger postcolonial debate within the humanities and social sciences. While it is a diverse field, the epistemic core argument within postcolonial studies is that the discursive dominance of the Western world/global North has continued after the end of the formal colonization of the global South. From this perspective, global knowledge production is still dominated by Western forms of intellectual inquiry, exemplified by an emphasis on supposed objectivity, universalism and scientific rationality, which buttresses a Western-dominated hierarchy of knowledge that fails to acknowledge its own 'situatedness'. Most contemporary scientific theories, which have their roots in Western Enlightenment and rational inquiry, are therefore inherently Eurocentric. Postcolonialism problematizes the Eurocentricity of contemporary scientific thought and methodology by arguing that it projects misleading theories, based on particular Western facts, on the global South, while also systematically ignoring Southern data for theorizing. As a result, while contemporary theories aim to be universally valid, they have an inherent Western bias because they are based on Western ideas and thought of in Western institutions, which makes them incapable of accurately presenting and explaining events, structures and movements in the South because they misinterpret the South's particularities.

From this perspective, social movement theory has a Western bias, which has led to a variety of authors claiming that mainstream theories are incapable of accurately explaining social movements in the Global South, because they were originally developed to explain movements in the North. Approaches like Resource Mobilization or Political Process Theory therefore have an overt focus on democratic contestation in developed economies and thus fail to take the South's different historical, political and cultural context into account. Along related lines, scholars such as Bojan Baća and Kerstin Jacobsson, focusing on social movements in postsocialist Central and Eastern Europe, have advanced parallel critiques, arguing that social movement theory should not only be applied to the Global East but also that dominant paradigms should be tested and revised in light of its distinct historical experiences.

The postcolonial critique on its own has been criticized for failing to come up with new empirical findings, offer different explanations for the development and behaviour of social movements or explain transnational movements.

It has also been argued that postcolonial social movements studies, despite forwarding some accurate criticism, is at risk of creating its own form of cultural essentialism and a 'new Orientalism'.

== Key concepts ==
=== Framing ===
Certain claims activists make on behalf of their social movement "resonate" with audiences including media, elites, sympathetic allies, and potential recruits. Successful frames draw upon shared cultural understandings (e.g. rights, morality). This perspective is firmly rooted in a social constructivist ontology. See the work of Robert Benford and David A. Snow. Over the last decade, political opportunity theorists have partially appropriated the framing perspective. It is called political theory of a social movement.

Social constructivism is a sociological theory where human development occurs within a social context, knowledge is constructed through interactions with others. "Social constructivism is that a sociological analysis of science and scientific knowledge is fruitful and reveals the social nature of science".

=== Rational choice ===
Under rational choice theory, individuals are rational actors who strategically weigh the costs and benefits of alternative courses of action and choose that course of action which is most likely to maximize their utility. The primary research problem from this perspective is the collective action problem, or why rational individuals would choose to join in collective action if they benefit from its acquisition even if they do not participate. See the work of Mancur Olson, Mark Lichbach, and Dennis Chong. In Theories of Political Protest and Social Movements, Karl-Dieter Opp incorporates a number of cultural concepts in his version of rational choice theory, as well as showing that several other approaches surreptitiously rely on rational-choice assumptions without admitting it.
