= Jonathan Levin (economist) =

American economist (born 1972)

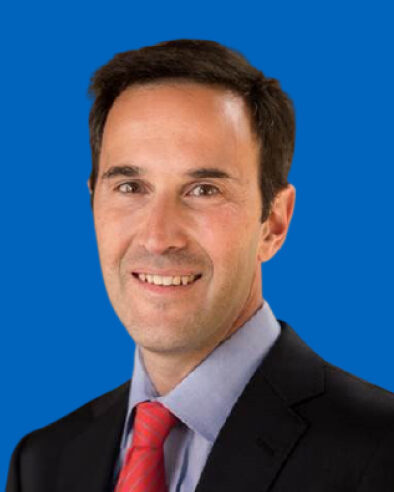
- Levin in 2021

13th President of Stanford University
- Incumbent
- Assumed office August 1, 2024
- Preceded by: Richard Saller

10th Dean of Stanford Graduate School of Business
- In office September 1, 2016 – July 31, 2024
- President: Marc Tessier-Lavigne; Richard Saller
- Preceded by: Garth Saloner
- Succeeded by: Sarah Soule

Personal details
- Born: November 17, 1972 (age 54) New Haven, Connecticut, U.S.
- Children: 3
- Parent: Rick Levin (father)
- Education: Stanford University (BA, BS); Nuffield College, Oxford (MPhil); Massachusetts Institute of Technology (PhD)
- Website: president.stanford.edu
- Scientific career
- Awards: John Bates Clark Medal (2011)
- Fields: Economics
- Workplaces: Stanford University
- Thesis: Relational contracts, incentives and information (1999)
- Doctoral advisor: Bengt Holmstrom
- Website: Information at IDEAS / RePEc

Jonathan David Levin (born November 17, 1972) is an American economist, currently serving as the 13th president of Stanford University since August 2024. He served as the 10th dean of the Stanford Graduate School of Business from 2016 to 2024.

Levin is known for his research in industrial organization, particularly in the areas of market design, antitrust economics, and the economics of contracting.

== Early life and education ==
Levin received a Bachelor of Arts in English and a Bachelor of Science in mathematics from Stanford University in 1994. He then received a Master of Philosophy in economics from Nuffield College, Oxford, in 1996 and a Ph.D. in economics from the Massachusetts Institute of Technology in 1999.

== Career ==
Levin was a postdoctoral scholar at the Cowles Foundation at Yale University. He joined Stanford as an assistant professor in 2000 and became a full professor in 2008.

His research is in the fields of Microeconomic Theory and Industrial Organization. From 2016 until July 31, 2024, he was the Philip H. Knight Professor and Dean of Stanford Graduate School of Business, becoming the President of Stanford University on August 1, 2024. He was the Holbrook Working Professor of Price Theory in the Department of Economics at Stanford and chair of Stanford Department of Economics from 2011 to 2014. From 2021 to 2025, he was a member of the President's Council of Advisors on Science and Technology (PCAST).

On April 4, 2024, the Stanford University Board of Trustees announced Levin would become Stanford's 13th president, effective August 1, 2024. Levin succeeds Richard Saller, who has served as Stanford's president on an interim basis since September 2023 after the resignation of Marc Tessier-Lavigne. Levin was ceremonially inaugurated to the Presidency on September 27, 2024. Levin is the first Stanford president since 1968 to have a Stanford degree.

== Awards and honors ==
Levin has received over a dozen honors and awards. He was awarded the 2011 John Bates Clark Medal as the outstanding American economist under the age of 40, regarded as the most distinguished economic title after the Nobel Prize.

Some of his other notable achievements include:

JONATHAN LEVIN

- American Academy of Achievement’s Golden Plate Award, 2026
- John Simon Guggenheim Memorial Fellowship, 2014
- American Economic Journal: Microeconomics, Best Paper Award, 2014
- Kavli Frontiers of Science Symposium, 2006
- Alfred P. Sloan Research Fellowship, 2004–2006
- George Webb Medley Thesis Prize, Oxford, 1996

== Personal life ==
Jonathan Levin is Jewish. Levin lives in Palo Alto with his wife, Amy, a physician, and their three children.

He is the son of former Yale University President Rick Levin.
