= Fabio Rojas =

American professor and author

- Education: University of Chicago (PhD)
- Occupations: Professor; author
- Years active: 2003–present

Fabio Rojas is Virginia L. Roberts Professor of Sociology at Indiana University Bloomington. He is the author of several sociological books, and starting with the first issue (Winter Issue) of 2018, he will be the co-editor of Contexts magazine with Rashawn Ray. Rojas has also made contributions to The Washington Post, The New York Times, and has been interviewed and appeared on C-SPAN, National Public Radio, and Vox magazine.

== Education and career ==
Rojas graduated from the University of Chicago with a Ph.D. in Sociology in 2003 and began teaching as a professor of sociology at Indiana University – Bloomington. He is the author of From Black Power to Black Studies: How a Radical Social Movement Became an Academic Discipline (2007, The Johns Hopkins University Press) and Theory for the Working Sociologist (2017, Columbia University Press). With Michael T. Heaney, he is a co-author of Party in the Street: The Antiwar Movement and the Democratic Party after 9/11 (2015, Cambridge University Press), which won the APSA's 2016 Leon J. Epstein award for the study of political parties and organizations. He is also the author of an e-book titled Grad Skool Rulz: Everything You Need to Know about Academia from Admissions to Tenure (2011).

In the Summer of 2017, he is the co-editor of the magazine Contexts: Understanding People in their Social Worlds, a publication of the American Sociological Association. The first editions that are printed under his leadership is in the Winter 2018 issue, which is released in February 2018. Overall, his research addresses organizational behavior, social movements, higher education, computer modeling, rational choice theory, social theory, and economic sociology.

== Awards ==
Rojas has received numerous awards for his research work and publications. In 2002, he co-wrote an article with Kirby D. Schroeder titled "A Game Theoretic Model of Sexually Transmitted Disease Epidemics" and this won the 2003 Outstanding Graduate Student Paper Award by the ASA in Mathematical Sociology. His book Party in the Streets was selected as a Choice Top 25 Outstanding Academic Book for 2015 by the American Library Association and also received the APSA Political Organizations and Parties Section's Leon Epstein Outstanding Book Award in 2016.

== Public work ==
Rojas has had his research featured in mass media as well. He wrote an article which discusses the role Twitter could play in predicting elections, which was published in The Washington Post on August 11, 2013. Furthermore, this article was mentioned in a C-SPAN segment that aired on August 17 of the same year, and the following day he made an appearance on C-SPAN to discuss the article. He has also written for The New York Times. and been interviewed by Vox magazine.
