= No Other Way Out =

Book by Jeff Goodwin

No Other Way Out: States and Revolutionary Movements, 1945-1991
- Author: Jeff Goodwin
- Language: English
- Genre: Non-fiction
- Publisher: Cambridge University Press
- Publication date: 2001

No Other Way Out: States and Revolutionary Movements, 1945-1991 is a book written by Jeff Goodwin. It analyzes revolutions through the state-centered perspective.

== Comparing Revolutionary Movements ==
In No Other Way Out: States and Revolutionary Movements, 1945-1991, Goodwin offers another comparative study on revolutions focusing on the second half of the twentieth century from 1914 to 1991. According to Goodwin, “revolutionary movements are not simply or exclusively a response to economic exploitation or inequality, but also and more directly a response to political oppression and violence, typically brutal and indiscriminate”. This idea is Goodwin's main thesis throughout the book and he further expands on it. Goodwin believes that understanding revolutions is “worthwhile not only because of the enormous importance of these movements for the national societies in which they occurred, but also for their effects on the configuration of power and beliefs in other societies and thus on the international balance of power as well". This comparative study on revolutions is worthwhile because it is different from all the others that exist. First, Goodwin uses a unique set of revolutions and revolutionary movements to analyze, making this analysis interesting and very instructive. Second, Goodwin analyzes not only those revolutions that were successful; he also includes failed revolutionary movements that did not succeed. By analyzing these failed revolutions, Goodwin is able to analyze the reasons why some revolutions occur and others simply deteriorate. Goodwin's goal for his analysis on revolutions is “to discover the general causal mechanics that do the most to explain the origins and trajectory of several important revolutionary movements". Before beginning to analyze revolutions Goodwin's guess is that, “the diverse political fortunes of the revolutionary movements in peripheral societies during this era were not fortuitous nor randomly distributed, but were the result of general causal mechanisms” (2001:8).

=== Defining Terms ===
Goodwin offers a definition of several important key terms that he will use throughout his analysis. To commence, he acknowledges that there are two different definitions for revolutions. For the first definition, the term revolution can “refer to any and all instances in which a state or political regime is overthrown and thereby transformed by a popular movement in an irregular, extra constitutional, and/or violent fashion” (Goodwin 2009:9) With this interpretation, there needs to be a mobilization of people against the state. The second definition states that “revolutions entail not only mass mobilization and regime change, but also more or less rapid and fundamental social, economic, and/or cultural change during or soon after the struggle for state power” (Goodwin 2001:8). Goodwin chooses the concept from the concept of the first revolution since it is more general and includes many more revolutionary movements.

Goodwin also defines other important terms that will be essential to his theory. Political context is defined as, “the ways in which a national society, or some component of it, is governed and regulated by, has access to, and otherwise relates to the national state as well as to the larger state system” (Goodwin 2001: 14). To Goodwin, political concept is the single most important factor that explains the formation and fate of revolutionary movements. Lastly he defines peripheral state as “a state whose power and projects are more or less strictly determine or at least very tightly constrained by a much more powerful ‘core’ or ‘metropolitan’ state within the state system” (Goodwin 2001:14). Throughout his theory, Goodwin will use these terms in order to further his argument and it is essential to define them correctly.

=== Theoretical Approaches to Revolutionary Movements ===
Before Goodwin offers his own theory on revolutions, he first discusses two other popular theories, the modernization theory and the Marxist theory. The “modernization theory links revolutions to the transitions from traditional to modern societies, that is, to the very process of modernization itself” (Goodwin 2001:17). Those who believe in the Marxist theory, “view revolutions as occurring in ‘transitional’ societies- only in this case transition which is seen as the result of class struggle, is from one economic mode of production to another” (Goodwin 2001:19-20). Goodwin believes that both of these theories, although not completely wrong, fail to completely analyze the political concept in which they are made. In addition to that there is a lot of disagreement in these theories that makes them less reliable.

The State-Centered Perspective: When studying revolutions, Goodwin places the focus on states, also known as the state-centered perspective. He focuses on the state because of two main reasons. The first is that any successful revolution will cause the breakdown or incapacitation of the state. The second reason is that “strong revolutionary movements, even if they ultimately fail to seize state power, will emerge only in opposition to states that are configured and that act in certain ways” (Goodwin 2001: 25) There are two reasons why the development of revolutionary movements is dependent on the state. Primarily, people will not support revolutionary movements unless they feel that the state is at fault for their everyday problems. The second reason is that individuals will not join revolutionary movements if they feel that doing so will only lead to more violence from the state. This second reason introduces another idea of people not joining revolutions unless they feel they have no other way out, which is exactly the title of the book.

Goodwin concludes in No Other Way Out that certain states lead to revolutions while others do not. According to him the formation of revolutionary movement in the periphery has been mainly caused by the “subset of violence and exclusionary authoritarian states that are also organizationally incoherent and militarily weak,” (Goodwin 2001: 26). Although there are many more factors that lead to revolutions, Goodwin's main focus is on the state itself. The state itself is at the center of his analysis since according to him the state-centered perspective is the most powerful tool when analyzing revolutions.

Four Types of State-Centered Analysis: There are four approaches to the state-centered analysis which are the state- autonomy, the state-capacity, the political-opportunity, and the state-constructionism. All four of these approaches emphasize a set of causal mechanisms which are “those processes whereby states shape, enable, or constrain economic, associational, cultural, and even social-psychological phenomena” (Goodwin 2001: 36). The state-autonomy perspective emphasizes on the autonomy of the state officials from the dominant social class. This dominant class includes politicians and military officials, among others, and they sometimes develop interests that are opposing to those interests of the popular will. The state-capacity approach focuses on the material and organizational capacity of the state officials’ political agenda. The political-opportunity approach on the other hand “emphasizes how the apparent tolerance, or responsiveness of states or “polities” influences the ability of mobilized social groups to act collectively and/or to influence state policies” (Goodwin 2001: 38). Lastly, the state-constructionism approach focuses on how the states share and alter the identities, goals, and ideas of actors in civil society.

Analytic Strengths of State-Centered Approaches to Revolution: Goodwin argues that his statist approach is imperative when solving key problems of the study of revolutions. This state-centered analysis has much strength that makes it the best tools for analyzing revolutions. Revolutions are phenomenons that are fairly modern and have occurred with much more frequency in the twentieth century. Many have asked themselves why revolutions became more frequent in the twentieth century and the state-centered perspective answers this question. The answer is that revolutions need states to occur and this international state system that is present now thus makes revolutions much more frequent. This is not the only question that this statist perspective is able to answer. The state-centered perspective is able to answer why radical movements are concerned with destroying and seizing state power. Following this is also the question as to why it is necessary for the state to break down. This statist perspective also solves the question of why, when, and where revolutions occur. Lastly through this method analysts can figure out why some groups are able to attract much support and others are not. Through the state-centered perspectives all of these questions are answered in the analysis of revolutions.

Goodwin believes that there are certain characteristics from states that make revolutionary movement more likely to develop. The first characteristic is that the state not only protects but also sponsors unpopular economic and social arrangements as well as cultural institutions. Another main characteristic is the repression and exclusion of mobilized groups from state power or resources. States where revolutions are more likely to develop also are indiscriminate and violent towards mobilized oppositional groups and figures. States that have weak policing capacities and infrastructural power are also more likely to produce revolutions. Lastly states that are characterized by a, “corrupt and arbitrary personalistic rule that alienates, weakens, or divides counterrevolutionary elites,” are more likely to develop revolutionary movements (Goodwin 2001: 49).

Critiques and Limitations of State-Centered Approaches: Goodwin acknowledges that there are many criticisms to his state-centered perspective on revolutions, but he argues that these critiques make unrealistic assumptions and they are completely unreliable. One of these critiques is that societies affect states just as much as states affect societies. Goodwin argues how even though states are not the only things that affect revolutions, and there are certainly other factors, they do tend to be at the center of the whole process and that is why they are at the center of the analysis. Another criticism states that in reality state officials are not the autonomous actors and they in fact are just being driven by the dominant class, challenging the state-autonomy approach. Again Goodwin disagrees with this claim as well as the other two critiques. One being that the state-centered analysis ignores the purpose and cultural dimensions of social action and the last one being that the distinction between states and societies is indefensible and should be eliminated. Although Goodwin disagrees with the critiques to the statist perspective he chooses to analyze revolutions, he does in fact acknowledge that there are certain limitation to this approach. Even though some limitations do exist, Goodwin argues that there are certain solutions to these. The main limitation in the state-centered perspective is that it fails to theorize sources that are not political or from the state. However even though this may be the case Goodwin argues that the state-centered perspective is still the best method for analyzing revolutions.

The Case of The Cuban Revolution: The Cuban Revolution is a clear example that not only shows the strengths of the state-centered perspective, it also shows its limitations. Goodwin explains how in Cuba there were two main reasons as to why Cuba was susceptible to a radical revolution. The first reason was the weakness of Cuba's clases economicas and the second was its strength of it clases populares or popular sectors. The Cuban state was also characterized by its “mediated sovereignty” and a “near-chronic crisis of political authority” (Goodwin 2001:60). Although the state had a lot to do in the Cuban revolution, this event was also marked by the mobilization of the masses. This is one of the reasons why the state-centered perspective is limited; it fails to analyze certain aspects of the revolution that were very important. On the other hand, Goodwin argues that the Cuban revolution needs to be analyzed in different forms in order to fully explain it since no one theory alone can fully analyze any revolution.

The Formation of Revolutionary Movements in Southeast Asia: Southeast Asia circa 1950 was a very important time in history in Southeast Asia. Southeast Asia was defined during this time by seven regional similarities. This region was defined by Western conquest and colonial rule, it had an integration of local economics into the capitalist world system, and it was marked by its development of widespread social grievances and social protests. In addition to these similarities, this region was defined by its formation of reformist and revolutionary parties and movements, the Japanese occupation and privations of World War II, the formation of anti-Japanese resistance movements, and lastly it was defined by the Western colonial powers’ attempt to reassert their dominance over Southeast Asia after the war.

After World War II, many dominating countries wanted to assert back their power on Southeast Asia, yet they were greeted by resistance. By the year 1950 there were several mass-based Communist movements that were challenging colonial and neocolonial regions in Vietnam, Malaya, and the Philippines. By contrast, the Indonesian struggle, which is seen by Goodwin as a political revolution, had already been won by non-Communist “populist” nationalists. Indonesian is a rare case and there are many explanations for what caused this anti-communism ideology. One main factor is the Japanese rule in Indonesia that ultimately brought many Indonesians into the middle class and liberated many popular non-communist nationalist leaders, thus spreading the dislike for communism. This anti-communism ideology was not caused solely by economic, class, or cultural factors; it was the cause of circumstances “of a highly contingent character” (Goodwin 2001:89). In order to fully analyze the situation in Southeast Asia Goodwin goes on to use the state-centered perspective come up with answers and patterns to these revolutionary movements in Southeast Asia.

The Only Domino: The Vietnamese Revolution in Comparative Perspective: In Southeast Asia, specifically Vietnam, Malaya, and the Philippines, many colonial regions were in the process of revolutionary movements. The outcome was of course very different in every region and Goodwin states that in order to analyze these different outcomes the state-centered perspective is the best tool to do so. Goodwin argues that “two political variables, against a general backdrop of colonial rule, widespread socioeconomic problems, and Japanese occupation, determined whether strong Communist-led national movements would form and take power in Southeast Asia” (2001:130-131). The formation and fate of the communist party therefore depended one two variables. One was “whether the Japanese relied upon Europeans or existing indigenous elites on the one hand, or sponsored populist nationalists on the other” (Goodwin 2001:131). The second variable is whether the rule of Western powers was inclusionary and reformist. Goodwin creates a figure that clearly shows the steps and outcomes of every possibility thus providing a generalization to the events in Southeast Asia.

=== Conclusion ===
The state-centered perspective is the strongest and most efficient tool when analyzing revolutions. States are ultimately an important factor that in all the cases determines the fate of the revolutionary movement and it also explains why revolutionary movements have different outcomes in different situations. According to Goodwin, “states powerfully determine the precise ways in which a range of other factors may contribute to both the mobilization and impact of revolutionary movements. He goes on to argue that, “a state-centered approach, in sum, is important not just or even mainly because of the importance of state breakdowns or political opportunities for seizures of power by preexisting movements, but also because the very formation and strength of revolutionary movements vis-a-vis other political challengers are strongly shaped by the ways in which political authorities rule and respond to challengers” (Goodwin 2001:133). State power, and its use, constructs the possibilities and outcomes for revolutionary movements, and that is why they must be at the center of the study of revolutions.
