= Hahrie Han =

American political scientist

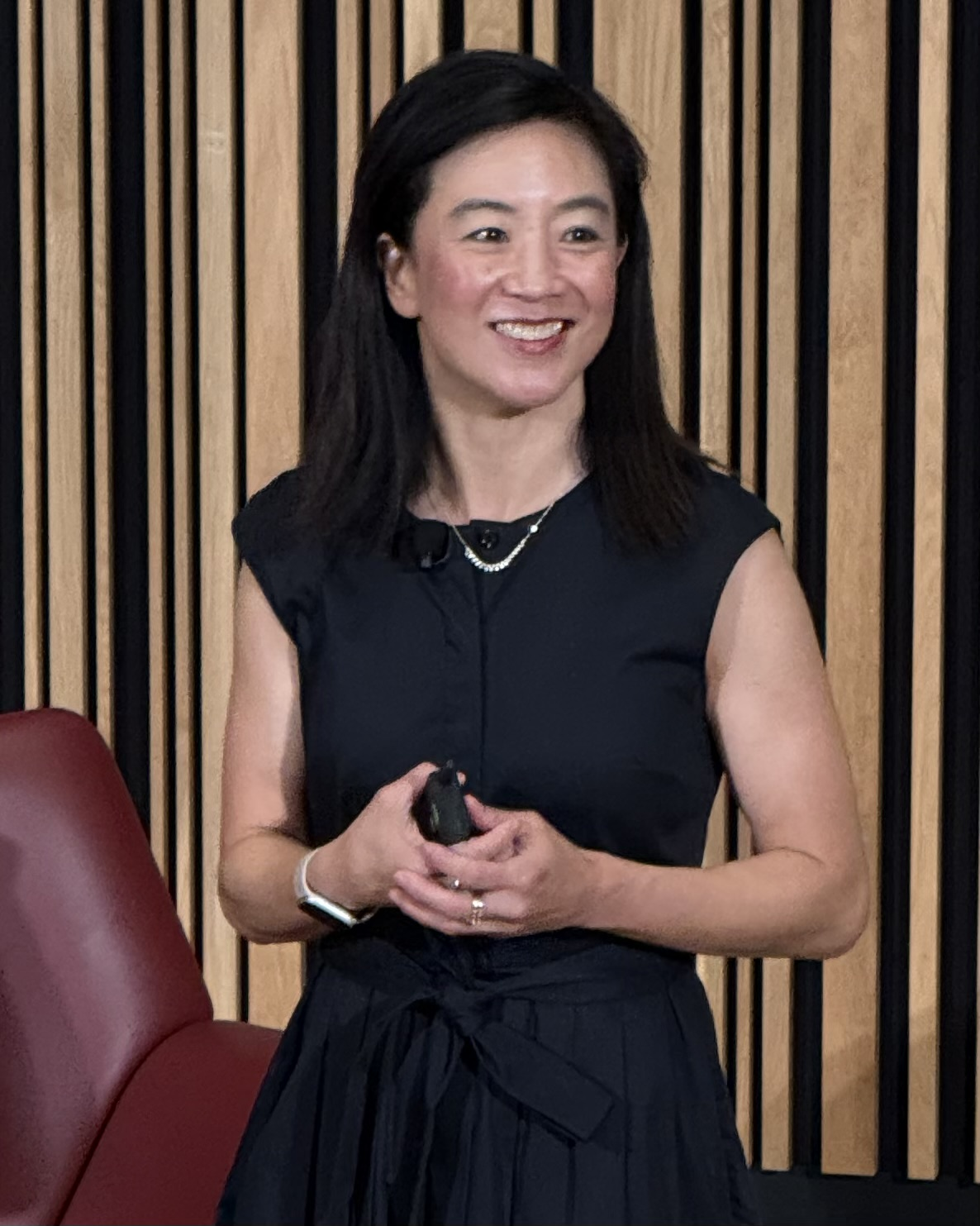
- Awards: MacArthur Fellowship (2025)

Academic background
- Education: Harvard University (BA, 1997); Stanford University (PhD, 2005)

Academic work
- Discipline: Political science
- Institutions: University of California, Santa Barbara; Johns Hopkins University
- Website: hahriehan.com

Hahrie C. Han is a Korean American political scientist at Johns Hopkins University. Han is recognized for her interdisciplinary research on organizing, collective action, and the role of civic associations in democratic societies. She was named a MacArthur Fellow in 2025.

== Early life and education ==
Han grew up in Alief, a neighborhood in Houston, Texas. She earned her Bachelor of Arts in American History and Literature from Harvard University in 1997. She completed her Ph.D. in American Politics at Stanford University in 2005.

== Academic career ==
Han was a Robert Wood Johnson Health Policy Scholar at Harvard University from 2009 to 2011 and an associate professor of Political Science at Wellesley College from 2005 to 2015. She was the Anton Vonk Professor of Political Science and Environmental Politics at the University of California, Santa Barbara from 2015 to 2019.

By 2025, Han held the Stavros Niarchos Foundation Professorship in Political Science at Johns Hopkins University. She was also faculty director of the P3 Research Lab and, in 2019, became inaugural director of the Stavros Niarchos Foundation (SNF) Agora Institute.

In 2025, Han received a MacArthur Fellowship; she was the first political scientist to receive the honor since 2001.

=== Research and publications ===
She has authored five books; her latest book, Undivided: The Quest for Racial Solidarity in an American Church (Knopf, 2024), examines efforts to address racial division within a large evangelical megachurch.

== Awards and honors ==
- 2025 MacArthur Fellow
- 2025 American Academy of Arts and Sciences membership
- 2022 Social Innovation Thought Leader of the Year, World Economic Forum's Schwab Foundation
- 2024 Tanner Lecture, Harvard University

== Works ==
=== Books ===
- Moved to Action: Motivation, Participation, and Inequality in American Politics. 2009.
- How Organizations Develop Activists: Civic Association and Leadership in the 21st Century. 2014.
- Groundbreakers: How Obama's 2.2 Million Volunteers Transformed Campaigning in America. 2014.
- Prisms of the People: Power and Organizing in Twenty-First-Century America. 2021.
- Undivided: The Quest for Racial Solidarity in an American Church. Knopf. 2024.

=== Articles ===
- Brady, David W.; Han, Hahrie; Pope, Jeremy C. (2007). "Primary Elections and Candidate Ideology: Out of Step with the Primary Electorate?". Legislative Studies Quarterly. 32 (1): 79–105. doi:10.3162/036298007X201994. ISSN 1939-9162.
- Han, Hahrie (May 2016). "The Organizational Roots of Political Activism: Field Experiments on Creating a Relational Context". American Political Science Review. 110 (2): 296–307. doi:10.1017/S000305541600006X. ISSN 0003-0554.
