= Rashawn Ray =

American sociologist

Rashawn Ray is a Professor of Sociology at the University of Maryland, College Park, and Senior Fellow in Governance Studies at the Brookings Institution. He edited Contexts magazine from 2017-2022, published by the American Sociological Association, with co-editor Fabio Rojas.

== Career ==
Ray graduated from Indiana University, Bloomington, with a Ph.D. in sociology in 2010. He joined the sociology faculty at the University of Maryland, College Park after serving as a Robert Wood Johnson Foundation Health Policy research scholar at the University of California, Berkeley from 2010 to 2012. His work pertains to social inequality and focuses on race and social activism. He is the author of Race and Ethnic Relations in the 21st Century: History, Theory, Institutions, and Policy.

== Awards ==
Ray has been awarded the American Association for the Advancement of Science Bhaumik Award for Public Engagement with Science (2022), the Public Understanding of Sociology Award from the American Sociological Association (2021), and the Morris Rosenberg Award for Outstanding Sociological Achievement from the DC Sociological Society (2020). In 2016, Ray won University of Maryland's Research Communicator Impact Award. He also has been awarded mentorship awards from the Philip Merrill Presidential Scholars Program and the Ronald E. McNair Post-Baccalaureate Achievement Program. Furthermore, he has received the Teaching in Excellence Award from the College of Behavioral and Social Sciences at the University of Maryland.

== Public work ==
Ray has written articles in Washington Post, USA Today, POLITICO, Business Insider, Newsweek, The Guardian, Huffington Post, NBC News, The Hill, The Conversation, and Public Radio International. Several of his articles have appeared in The New York Times on a wide range of social topics including race and policing, healthcare, parenting styles, and more. He has been featured in many news and media reports including on CNN, MSNBC, CBS, ABC, C-Span, PBS, HLN, Al Jazeera, NPR, and Fox.
