= Jodi O'Brien =

American scientist

Jodi O'Brien is a professor of Sociology and Women and Gender Studies at Seattle University. Her teaching and research interests include gender. sexuality, religion, social psychology, and social inequality. She is the editor of the Encyclopedia of Gender and Society and co-editor of the “Contemporary Sociological Perspectives” book series. Her books include The Production of Reality, Social Prisms, and Everyday Inequalities. O'Brien is openly gay.

There was controversy when O'Brien was appointed dean of the college of arts and sciences at Marquette University. The university rescinded the offer because some of her academic writings were at odds with the church's position on same-sex marriage. Dozens of faculty took out a full-page ad in the Milwaukee Journal Sentinel, protesting Marquette's decision to withdraw O'Brien's appointment based on her sexual orientation. The protest was unsuccessful, and O'Brien remains at Seattle University to this day (as of March 2026), where her role has grown to include leadership of the university's effort to foster diversity among faculty.

== Key publications ==
- O'Brien, Jodi. 2022. The Production of Reality: Essays and Readings in Social Interaction, 7th Edition. Sage.
- O’Brien, Jodi. 2016. “Seeing Agnes: Notes on a Transgender Biocultural Ethnomethodology.” Symbolic Interaction, Vol. 39:306-329.
- O’Brien, Jodi. 2012. “Stained Glass Ceilings: Religion, Sexuality and the Cultural Politics of Belonging.” Social Philosophy Today, Vol. 28:5-26.
- O’Brien, Jodi. 2010. “Seldom Told Tales from the Field: Special Issue Editor’s Introduction.” Journal of Contemporary Ethnography, Vol. 39:471-482.
- O’Brien, Jodi. 2009. “Sociology as an Epistemology of Contradiction.” Sociological Perspectives. Vol. 52:5-22.
- O’Brien, Jodi. 2008. “Complicating Homophobia.” Sexualities. Vol.11:496-512.
- Editor: “Sociology ReWired” (with Marcus Hunter). Routledge. 2007–present.
