= James M. Jasper =

American writer and sociologist

James Macdonald Jasper

Academic background
- Education: PhD
- Alma mater: University of California, Berkeley
- Thesis: The Politics of Nuclear Energy in France, Sweden and the United States (1988)
- Doctoral advisor: Harold Wilensky

Academic work
- Notable students: Jane McAlevey

James Macdonald Jasper (born 1957) is a writer and sociologist who has taught Ph.D. students at the Graduate Center of the City University of New York since 2007. He is best known for his research and theories about culture and politics, especially the cultural and emotional dimensions of protest movements.

== Biography ==
Jasper was born on September 30, 1957, in Takoma Park, Maryland, adjacent to Washington, D.C. His parents, Jane Howard-Jasper (born Betty Jane Howard) and James Dudley Jasper, separated just before he was born, and he was raised exclusively by his mother.

Jasper was prepared at Saint James School, where he was elected Senior Prefect and graduated in the Class of 1975. He thence attended Harvard College where he received the Bachelor of Arts magna cum laude in economics(1979). He was awarded the M.A. and Ph.D. degrees in sociology from the University of California at Berkeley (1988).

Jasper taught at New York University from January 1987 to the summer of 1996, leaving after a protracted tenure battle that attracted angry letters from sociologists around the United States. In the following ten years, he taught as a visiting professor at Columbia University, Princeton University, and the New School for Social Research. Since the fall of 2007, he has been affiliated with the sociology Ph.D. program of the Graduate Center of the City University of New York, where he founded the Politics and Protest Workshop.

== Scholarship ==
Jasper has been writing about politics and culture since the mid-1980s. His books include Nuclear Politics, about energy policy in France, Sweden, and the United States; The Animal Rights Crusade, an examination of the moral dimensions of protest coauthored with Dorothy Nelkin; The Art of Moral Protest, which developed cultural understandings of social movements and reintroduced emotions as an analytic dimension; Restless Nation, which looks at the negative and positive effects of Americans’ propensity to move so often; and Getting Your Way, which offers a sociological language for talking about strategic action that avoids the determinism of game theory.

In recent years Jasper has turned from empirical studies of politics and protest to theoretical work on culture and politics. His most influential contribution has been to show that emotions are a part of culture, allowing humans to adapt to the world around them, to process information, and to engage with others. He differs from many culturally oriented scholars in embracing a kind of methodological individualism, insisting that beliefs, frames, collective identities, and emotions have an effect only through individuals.

Jasper has collaborated on a number of projects with Jeff Goodwin, a sociologist at New York University, including the edited books Rethinking Social Movements, The Contexts Reader, and the four-volume Social Movements. Goodwin, Jasper, and Francesca Polletta together edited Passionate Politics.

From 2005 to 2007 Jasper and Goodwin edited Contexts magazine, bringing trademark humor to the American Sociological Association’s magazine intended to reach popular audiences. Jasper also used the pen name Harry Green to write a controversial column called “the Fool” at the back of each issue.

In addition to Jeff Goodwin, Dorothy Nelkin, and Francesca Polletta, Jasper's coauthors have included former students Scott Sanders, Jane Poulsen, Cynthia Gordon, and Mary Bernstein.

With political scientist Clifford Bob, Jasper began editing a book series, the Oxford Studies in Culture and Politics, in 2010.

== The Art of Moral Protest ==
In The Art of Moral Protest, Jasper makes several important contributions to social movement theory. Some of these contributions are explained below.

=== Citizenship/post-citizenship distinction ===
Jasper draws an important distinction between citizenship and post-citizenship movements. Citizenship movements are "organized by and on behalf of categories of people excluded in some way from full human rights, political participation, or basic economic protections." Almost by definition, then, citizenship movements make their claims primarily against the state, which generally serves as the original granter and primary enforcer of rights and other protections. Claims can, of course, also be made against other large bodies that grant rights or protections, e.g., corporations. Examples of citizenship movements include "industrial workers, women, and later racial and ethnic minorities."

Post-citizenship movements, on the other hand, are "composed of people already integrated into their society’s political, economic, and educational systems." Since such people already possess the benefits of normal citizenship, they may “pursue protections or benefits for others," additional non-citizenship benefits for themselves, or both. Note that since "others" are not necessarily categories of people, post-citizenship movements do not always make their claims against the state. Examples of post-citizenship movements include “protection of the environment, peace and disarmament, alternative healing, life-style protections, and animal rights." Environmental protesters may lobby particular states for policy changes, but their target may be the wider public. For instance, protesters who encourage individual consumers to recycle their glass and plastic containers may be less concerned with making claims against the state than with disseminating an important message as widely as possible. In addition, protesters may be seeking benefits for themselves as well, e.g., the opportunity to bond with a group of like-minded people. Such benefits are what Jasper calls the "pleasures of protest."

=== Four dimensions of protest ===
In Chapter 3, Jasper advances a model of social movements containing four "autonomous dimensions": resources, strategy, culture, and biography. Jasper thinks that one major advantage of his model is its ability to draw on the respective strengths of prior theories—crowd theory, rational choice theory, resource mobilization, and political opportunity—while not overstretching any single dimension of protest. For example, he thinks that resource mobilization theory conflates strategy with resources. By isolating these various dimensions analytically, Jasper aims to show how they interact while retaining their respective logics.

Brief definitions of each of these dimensions can be given as follows. According to Jasper, resources are understood as "physical technologies and their capacities, or the money to buy these technologies." An example of a resource is a social movement organization's computers, or the funds used to purchase them. Secondly, strategy is defined as "the choices made by individuals and organizations in their interactions with other players, especially opponents." For example, a social movement organization’s choice to march in the street instead of filing a lawsuit constitutes a strategic choice. Third, culture can be understood as "shared understandings (emotional, moral, and cognitive) and their embodiments." For example, a group of animal rights activists might share the belief that all life is sacred. By Jasper's definition, this belief can be considered part of the group's culture. Lastly, biography is considered by Jasper to be the "individual constellations of cultural meanings, personalities, sense of self, derived from biographical experiences." For example, one of the aforementioned animal rights activists might have seen animal cruelty at a dog pound, an individual experience which has made him or her highly sensitive to the needs and condition of animals.

=== "Tastes in tactics" ===
Of particular interest is Jasper's identification of a significant way in which culture and biography influence strategy: different protestors have different "tastes in tactics." Different protesters have different tastes, and these are a result of “a complex process combining rational assessments of a range of tactics, moral and affective valuations of those tactics, and the recruitment of new participants with no investment in prior tactics." For example, a social movement organization may initially be composed of protesters who largely think that non-violent mass demonstrations are the best form of protest. Various cultural and biographical factors might explain this preference: perhaps these protesters are college students who place great value on the teachings of Gandhi. This organization may then give way to a new crop of protesters who are not so invested in these prior tactics; they may even consciously eschew the nonviolent ways of their predecessors in order to differentiate themselves.

== Selected books ==
- Nuclear Politics: Energy and the State in the United States, Sweden, and France. Princeton University Press. 1990.
- The Animal Rights Crusade: The Growth of a Moral Protest. The Free Press. 1992. With Dorothy Nelkin.
- The Art of Moral Protest: Culture, Biography, and Creativity in Social Movements. University of Chicago Press. 1997.
- Restless Nation: Starting Over in America. University of Chicago Press. 2000.
- Passionate Politics: Emotions and Social Movements. University of Chicago Press. 2001. With Jeff Goodwin and Francesca Polletta.
- Getting Your Way: Strategic Dilemmas in Real Life. University of Chicago Press. 2006.
- Contention in Context: Political Opportunities and the Emergence of Protest. Stanford University Press, 2012. With Jeff Goodwin.
- Protest: A Cultural Introduction to Social Movements. Polity Press, 2014.

== Selected articles ==
- "Las emociones y los movimientos sociales: veinte años de teoría e investigación" Revista Latinoamericana de Estudios sobre Cuerpos Emociones y Sociedad Nº10. Año 4. Diciembre 2012-marzo de 2013. Argentina. ISSN 1852-8759. pages 46–66.
- "¿De la Estructura a la Acción? La Teoría de los Movimientos Socials después de los Grandes Paradigmas." Sociológica 27(75). 2012. pages 7–48.
- "Emotions and Social Movements: Twenty Years of Theory and Research." Annual Review of Sociology 37. 2011. pages 285–304.
- "Social Movement Theory Today: Toward a Theory of Action?" Sociology Compass 10. 2010. pages 965–976.
- "The Rhetoric of Sociological Facts." Sociological Forum 22(3). 2007. pages 270–299. With Michael P. Young.
- "A Strategic Approach to Collective Action: Looking for Agency in Social Movement Choices." Mobilization 9(1). 2004. pages 1–16.
- "L'Art de la Protestation Collective." Raisons Pratiques 12. Special issue under the direction of Daniel Cefäi and Danny Trom, Les Formes de l'Action Collective: Mobilisations dans des Arènes Publiques (Paris: Editions de l'Ecole des Hautes Etudes en Sciences Sociales). 2001. pages 135–159.
- "Collective Identity and Social Movements." Annual Review of Sociology 27. 2001. pages 283–305. With Francesca Polletta.
- "The Return of the Repressed: The Fall and Rise of Emotions in Social Movement Theory." Mobilization 5(1). 2000. pages 65–84. With Jeff Goodwin and Francesca Polletta.
- "Nostalgie: Verdammung der Gegenwart, Kontrolle der Zukunft." Lettre International 47. 1999. pages 74–81.
- "Caught in a Winding, Snarling Vine: the Structural Bias of Political Process Theory." Sociological Forum 14(1). 1999. pages 27–54. With Jeff Goodwin.
- "The Emotions of Protest: Affective and Reactive Emotions in and around Social Movements." Sociological Forum 13(3). 1998. pages 397–424.
- "Interests and Credibility: Whistleblowers in Technological Conflicts." Social Science Information 35(3). 1996. pages 565–589. With Mary Bernstein. French translation: "Les Tireurs d'Alarme dans les Conflits sur les Risques Technologiques." Politix 44 (1998). pages 109–134.
- "Overcoming the 'NIMBY' Label: Rhetorical and Organizational Links for Local Protestors." Research in Social Movements, Conflicts and Change 19. 1996. pages 153–175. With Cynthia Gordon.
- "Recruiting Strangers and Friends: Moral Shocks and Social Networks in Animal Rights and Antinuclear Protest." Social Problems 42(4). 1995. pages 401–420. With Jane D. Poulsen.
- “Big Institutions in Local Politics: American Universities, the Public, and Animal Protection Efforts." Social Science Information 34(3). 1995. pages 491–509. With Scott Sanders.
- "Civil Politics in the Animal Rights Conflict: God Terms versus Casuistry in Cambridge, Massachusetts." Science, Technology, and Human Values 19(2). 1994. pages 169–188. With Scott Sanders.
- "Fighting Back: Vulnerabilities, Blunders, and Countermobilization by the Targets of Three Animal Rights Campaigns." Sociological Forum 8(4). 1993. page 639–657.
- "The Politics of Abstractions: Instrumental and Moralist Rhetorics in Public Debate." Social Research 59(2). 1992. pages 315–344.
- "Gods, Titans, and Mortals: Patterns of State Involvement in Nuclear Development." Energy Policy 20(7). 1992. pages 653–659.
- "The Political Life Cycle of Technological Controversies." Social Forces 67(2). 1988. pages 357–377.

== See also ==
- Moral shock – Concept in sociology
- Social Movement Theory – Interdisciplinary social study
