= Jeff Goodwin =

American sociologist

- Born: January 28, 1958 (age 68)

Academic background
- Education: Harvard University

Academic work
- School or tradition: Comparative Historical
- Institutions: New York University
- Main interests: Revolution · Terrorism
- Notable ideas: Political Context

Jeffrey Roger Goodwin (born January 28, 1958) is a professor of sociology at New York University. He has served as chair of several sections of the American Sociological Association (ASA) and was coeditor of the ASA journal Contexts from 2004 to 2007.

He has written about social movements, political violence, and revolutions and is known for his book No Other Way Out: States and Revolutionary Movements, 1945-1991. He has also written about W. E. B. Du Bois and the black radical tradition, including Black Marxism.

== Early life and education ==
Goodwin was born in Hollywood, Florida, and grew up in Ft. Lauderdale, Florida. His parents were public school teachers in Broward County. He graduated from Nova High School in Davie, Florida, in 1976. Goodwin attended Harvard University, where he graduated magna cum laude with a Bachelor of Arts (BA) in social studies in 1980, and later obtained a Master of Arts (MA) and, in November 1988, a Doctor of Philosophy (PhD) degree in sociology. His graduate-school cohort included Michael Macy, Ellen Immergut, and Calvin Morrill. Theda Skocpol chaired his dissertation committee.

== Career ==
Following his doctoral studies, Goodwin began his academic career as an assistant professor of political science and sociology at Northwestern University from 1989 to 1991. Goodwin then moved to New York University (NYU) in 1991, serving as an assistant professor of sociology until 1997. He progressed to the rank of associate professor of sociology until 2003, when he was promoted to full professor of sociology, a position he has held since. In 2009, Goodwin served as a visiting fellow at the European University Institute in Florence.

Throughout his academic career, Goodwin has been actively involved in various academic organizations, holding elective offices such as executive board member positions in the International Sociological Association and the Eastern Sociological Society as well as in the ASA.

Goodwin has been elected chair of four sections of the ASA, namely, the Comparative and Historical Sociology section, the Collective Behavior and Social Movements Section, the Peace, War, and Social Conflict Section, and the Section on Marxist Sociology.

== Research ==
Goodwin has written and edited a number of works with his friend and former NYU colleague James M. Jasper. They wrote a famous critique of the political-opportunity theory developed by Charles Tilly and Doug McAdam, republished in Rethinking Social Movements, which Goodwin and Jasper edited. They also edited The Contexts Reader (New York: W. W. Norton), Social Movements (Routledge), The Social Movements Reader (Wiley-Blackwell), and (with Francesca Polletta) Passionate Politics (University of Chicago Press), a leading work in the sociology of emotions. Goodwin has also written a series of papers on revolutions and terrorism, respectively.

== Advocacy ==
Goodwin has long been a critic of U.S. support for governments and other actors engaged in gross human rights abuses, from apartheid South Africa to Central America to Israel. In October 2011, Goodwin was one of 132 New York University (NYU) faculty and staff members who signed a statement calling for disinvestment in several American companies that do business in Israel. In response to sharp criticism from Congressman Gary Ackerman, Goodwin accused Ackerman of moral blindness and stated that "Ackerman's apparent denial that Israel is occupying Palestinian territories and systematically violating basic Palestinian rights is simply shocking." Goodwin is a long-time member of Democratic Socialists of America (DSA).

== Awards and recognition ==
- Mattei Dogan Award, honorable mention (for best book published in the field of comparative research), Society for Comparative Research, 2003, for No Other Way Out: States and Revolutionary Movements, 1945-1991 (Cambridge: Cambridge University Press, 2001)
- Outstanding Book Prize, Collective Behavior and Social Movements Section of the American Sociological Association in 2002, for No Other Way Out: States and Revolutionary Movements, 1945-1991 (Cambridge: Cambridge University Press, 2001)
- Barrington Moore Prize for the best article in the field of comparative-historical sociology.

== Select publications ==
=== Books and edited volumes ===
- Maney, Gregory M.; Kutz-Flamenbaum, Rachel V.; Rohlinger, Deana A.; ——, eds. (2012). Strategies for social change. Social movements, protest, and contention. Minneapolis, MN: University of Minnesota Press. ISBN 978-0-8166-7289-9. OCLC 759695877.
- ——; Jasper, James M., eds. (2012). Contention in context: political opportunities and the emergence of protest. Stanford, CA: Stanford University Press. ISBN 978-0-8047-7611-0.
- ——; Jasper, James M., eds. (2008). The contexts reader (1st ed.). New York: W.W. Norton. ISBN 978-0-393-92989-8. OCLC 122526374.
- ——; Jasper, James M., eds. (2004). Rethinking social movements: structure, meaning, and emotion. People, passions, and power. Lanham, MD: Rowman & Littlefield Publishers. ISBN 978-0-7425-2595-5.
- ——; Jasper, James M., eds. (2003). The social movements reader: cases and concepts. Blackwell readers in sociology. Malden, MA: Blackwell. ISBN 978-0-631-22195-1.
- —— (2003) [2001]. No other way out: states and revolutionary movements, 1945 - 1991. Cambridge studies in comparative politics (Reprinted ed.). Cambridge: Cambridge Univ. Press. ISBN 978-0-521-62069-7.
- ——; Jasper, James M.; Polletta, Francesca, eds. (2001). Passionate politics: emotions and social movements. Chicago: University of Chicago Press. ISBN 978-0-226-30398-7.

=== Articles ===
- —— (2022). "Black Reconstruction as Class War". Catalyst. 6 (1).
- —— (14 March 2019). "The Causes of Terrorism". In Chenoweth, Erica; English, Richard; Gofas, Andreas; Kalyvas, Stathis N. (eds.). The Oxford Handbook of Terrorism. pp. 252–267. doi:10.1093/oxfordhb/9780198732914.013.14. ISBN 978-0-19-873291-4.
- —— (2008). "Revolutions". In Kurtz, Lester R. (ed.). Encyclopedia of violence, peace, & conflict. pp. 1870–1880. doi:10.1016/B978-012373985-8.00156-2. ISBN 978-012373985-8.
- —— (2007). "'The Struggle Made Me a Non-Racialist': Why There Was So Little Terrorism in the Antiapartheid Struggle". Mobilization. 12 (2): 193–203. doi:10.17813/maiq.12.2.c27p720k825u3636.
- —— (2006). "A Theory of Categorical Terrorism". Social Forces. 84 (4): 2027–2046. doi:10.1353/sof.2006.0090.
- —— (2006). "How Not to Explain Terrorism". European Journal of Sociology / Archives Européennes de Sociologie / Europäisches Archiv für Soziologie. 47 (3): 477–482. doi:10.1017/S0003975606000269. ISSN 0003-9756.
- —— (2006). "What Do We Really Know about (Suicide) Terrorism?". Sociological Forum. 21 (2): 315–330. doi:10.1007/s11206-006-9017-3. ISSN 0884-8971.
- —— (October 2004). "Review essay: What must we explain to explain terrorism?". Social Movement Studies. 3 (2): 259–265. doi:10.1080/1474283042000266155. ISSN 1474-2837.
- Emirbayer, Mustafa; Goodwin, Jeff (1994). "Network Analysis, Culture, and the Problem of Agency". American Journal of Sociology. 99 (6): 1411–1454. doi:10.1086/230450. ISSN 0002-9602.*
- ——; Skocpol, Theda (December 1989). "Explaining Revolutions in the Contemporary Third World". Politics & Society. 17 (4): 489–509. doi:10.1177/003232928901700403. ISSN 0032-3292.
