= Gill (name) =

Surname or given name

Gill may be a surname or given name, derived from a number of unrelated sources.

== Europe ==
In Europe, various cultures use the name, examples being:

- the Dutch form of the given name Giles
- in English, Gill may be a hypocorism of a number of given names, including Giles, Julian, William (Guillaume), Gillian, Gilbert
- in Northern English, Scots and Norwegian, it may be a topographic name, ultimately derived from Old Norse gil 'ravine'; for example: Lord Gill
- as a surname, an anglicization of the Scottish or Irish patronymic McGill (or Mac Gille, Mac An Ghoill and variants), also derived from the origins of the same English name.

== Indian subcontinent ==
- in Punjab, a clan of Jats and Ramgharias (ਗਿੱਲ or گل), it may be derived from the Punjabi word 'gil' meaning "moisture". According to oral history, the progenitor of the clan was a man named Gill. Shergill, Virk, and Sidhu are descendant clans of the Gill Jat clan. The name is also used by the Chuhra (Balmiki and Bhangi) caste, including the Mirasis. According to bhāt (bardic) records, the Gill Jat clan claims origin to an abandoned child found by a raja in a moist, jungle area of the wilds who was being attended by a lion. This tale is recounted in colonial-era literature. Connections to historic and contemporary Iranic peoples, such as the ancient Gelae tribe of the Scythians and the present-day Gilaki people, and locations such as Gilan, have been suggested. There were half a million Gill Jats recorded in the 1881 British India census. The Gill Jats had a marriage custom which involved digging a hole in a muddy spring. The Gill surname is also common amongst the Punjabi diaspora in Canada, as many Punjabi-Canadians have ancestral origins from a cluster of 52 villages in Moga, Ludhiana, and Faridkot districts where the Gill surname is common.

== West Asia ==
In Hebrew, a masculine given name or byname meaning "joy, gladness" (גִּיל, feminine form גִּילָה, Gilla).

== East Asia ==
In Korean, a common personal name often transliterated as Gil.

== People with the surname Gill ==
- Aastha Gill (born 1991), Indian playback singer
- A. A. Gill (Adrian Anthony Gill, 1954–2016), British writer and critic
- Adrian Gill (1937–1986), Australian meteorologist and oceanographer
- Alan Gill, English musician
- Albert Gill (1879–1916), English Victoria Cross recipient
- Amanpreet Gill, Canadian politician
- Amarjeet Gill, Canadian politician
- Amber Gill (born 1997), English television personality and author
- Amrinder Gill (born 1976), Indian singer and actor
- André Gill (1840–1885), French caricaturist
- Andy Gill (1956–2020), English musician, member of the rock band Gang of Four
- Anthony Gill (disambiguation), several people
- Anton Gill (born 1948), English historian and novelist
- Arie Gill-Glick (1930–2016), Israeli Olympic runner
- Aurélien Gill (1933–2015), Canadian senator
- Avtar Gill, Indian Bollywood actor
- Basil Gill (1877–1955), English stage and film actor
- Ben Gill (born 1987), English professional footballer
- Bob Gill (disambiguation), several people
- Bobby Gill (born 1959), NASCAR driver
- Brandon Gill (born 1994), American politician
- Brendan Gill (1914–1997), American journalist
- Brian Gill, Lord Gill (born 1942), retired Lord President of Scotland
- Bryan Nash Gill (1961–2013), American artist
- Cam Gill (born 1997), American football player
- Charles Gill (disambiguation), several people
- Christopher Gill (born 1936), British politician
- Colin Gill (1892–1940), British artist
- Conor Gill (born 1980), American lacrosse player
- Craig Gill (musician) (born 1961), British musician of Inspiral Carpets
- Dalwinder Gill, Canadian politician
- Dante "Tex" Gill (1930–2003), American trans brothel owner
- Darrell Gill Jr. (born 2004), American football player
- David Gill (disambiguation), several people
- DeLancey W. Gill (1859–1940), American photographer
- Duane Gill, American professional wrestler
- Eddie Gill (born 1978), American basketball player
- Edmund Dwen Gill (1908–1986), Australian geologist, palaeontologist and curator
- Edward Gill, 18th century English cricketer
- Eric Gill (1882–1940), British artist and typographer
- Ernest Gill (1877–1950), English cricketer and footballer
- Eugene Gill (1898–1981), American college sports coach
- Frank Gill (ornithologist) (born 1941), American ornithologist
- Gaurav Gill, Indian race/rally car driver
- George Gill (disambiguation), several people
- Gugu Gill, Indian actor
- Gursimrat Singh Gill, Indian footballer
- Hal Gill (born 1975), American ice hockey player
- Hanna Gill-Piątek, Polish politician
- Harry Gill (disambiguation), several people
- Irving Gill (1870–1936), American architect
- Jacob Gill, American NWA wrestler
- Jacquelyn Gill, American paleoecologist
- Jaelen Gill (born 1999), American football player
- James Gill (disambiguation), several people
- Jassie Gill, Indian singer and actor
- JB Gill (born 1986), English singer and farmer
- Jenny Gill (born 1951), New Zealand executive
- Jocelyn Gill (1916–1984), American astronomer
- Joe Gill (1919–2006), American comics writer
- John Gill (disambiguation), several people
- Johnny Gill (disambiguation), several people
- Jordan Gill (born 1994), British boxer
- Joseph Gill (disambiguation), several people
- Juan Bautista Gill (1840–1877), President of Paraguay
- Kanwar Pal Singh Gill, Indian police chief
- Keenu Gill (born 1990), Hong Kong cricketer
- Keith Gill (born 1986), American financial analyst and investor
- Keith Gill (athletic director), American sports director
- Ken Gill (disambiguation), several people
- Kendall Gill (born 1968), American basketball player
- Kimveer Gill (1981–2006), Canadian school shooter
- Lachhman Singh Gill, Indian politician, chief minister of Punjab
- Lesley Gill, American anthropologist
- Liam Gill (rugby) (born 1992), Australian Rugby Union player
- Liam Gill (snowboarder) (born 2003), Canadian snowboarder
- Libby Gill, American personal coach
- MacDonald Gill (1884–1947), English artist
- Madge Gill (1882–1961), English artist
- Margaret Gill (1797–1864), first wife of American black actor Ira Frederick Aldridge
- Mary Gill (disambiguation), several people
- Michel Gill (born 1960), American actor
- Minna Gill (1896–1964), American librarian
- Moses Gill (1734–1800), American politician
- M. S. Gill (1936–2023), Indian bureaucrat, politician and writer
- Nathan Gill (born 1973), British Reform/UKIP politician
- Neelam Gill (born 1995), British model
- Neena Gill, British Labour politician
- Nia Gill (born 1948), American Democratic Party politician
- Nicolas Gill (born 1972), Canadian judo competitor
- Orlando Gill (born 2000), Paraguayan footballer
- Paul Gill (born 1963), English cricketer
- Parm Gill (born 1974), Canadian Conservative politician
- Parmjit Singh Gill (born 1966), British Liberal Democrat politician
- Peter Gill (disambiguation), several people
- Piara Singh Gill, Indian nuclear physicist & professor
- Prabhsukhan Singh Gill, Indian football goalkeeper
- Priya Gill (born 1975), Indian Bollywood actress
- R. R. Rockingham Gill (born 1944), Welsh philosophy lecturer
- Raminder Gill, Canadian politician in Ontario
- Ren Eryn Gill (born 1990), Welsh rapper, songwriter, producer and musician
- Richard Gill (disambiguation), several people
- Robin D. Gill (born 1951), American japanologist
- Robin Gill (journalist), Canadian journalist
- Roopi Gill (born 1997), Indian actress and model
- Rosalie Lorraine Gill (1867–1898), American painter
- Samuel Thomas Gill (1818–1880), early Australian colonial artist
- Sarah Ann Gill (1795–1866), Barbadian folk hero
- Sean Gill, American writer and film editor
- Shehnaaz Kaur Gill, Indian actress and singer
- Shae Gill, Pakistani singer and cover-artist
- Shubman Gill, Indian cricketer
- Slats Gill (1901–1966), American basketball and baseball coach
- Stanley Gill (1926–1975), British computer scientist
- Steve Gill, American radio host
- Sukhman Gill, Canadian politician
- T. P. Gill (Thomas Patrick Gill, 1858–1931), Irish politician
- Terry Gill, British actor
- Thea Gill (born 1970), Canadian actress
- Theodore Nicholas Gill (1837–1914), American ichthyologist
- Thomas Gill (disambiguation), several people
- Tim Gill (born 1953), American software entrepreneur and gay rights activist
- Tom Gill (disambiguation), several people
- Trenton Gill (born 1999), American football player
- Turner Gill (born 1962), American college football coach
- Vince Gill (born 1957), American country singer–songwriter
- Warren C. Gill (1912–1987), American Coast Guardsman and politician
- William Henry Gill (composer) (1839–1923), Manx musical scholar
- W. Walter Gill (1876–1963), Manx folklorist and poet
- Walter Gill (1851–1929), forestry administrator in South Australia

== People with the given name Gill ==
=== Women ===
- Gill Aitken, British lawyer, civil servant and university administrator
- Gill Bennett, British historian and civil servant
- Gill Berkeley (born 1962/1963), Scottish academic administrator
- Gill Brown (born 1965), British field hockey player
- Gill Burns (born 1964), British rugby union player
- Gill Cowley (born 1955), Zimbabwean field hockey player
- Gill Deacon (born 1966), Canadian author and broadcaster
- Gill S. Freeman (born 1949), American judge
- Gill Furniss (born 1957), British politician
- Gill Gatfield (born 1963), New Zealand sculptor
- Gill German, British politician
- Gill Hicks (born 1968), Australian motivational speaker, author, curator, and trustee for several cultural organisations
- Gill Isles, British producer
- Gill James (born 1934), Australian politician
- Gill Langley (born 1952), British scientist and writer
- Gill Livingston, British psychiatrist
- Gill Marcus (born 1949), Australian banker and politician
- Gill Matthewson, New Zealand-Australian architect, scholar and educator
- Gill McConway (born 1950), New Zealand cricketer
- Gill Miles (born 1941), Welsh international lawn bowler
- Gill Mitchell (born 1949), English international lawn and indoor bowler
- Gill Morgan (born 1953), British civil servant
- Gill Perry, British professor
- Gill Pyrah (born 1957), English broadcaster and journalist
- Gill Rosenberg (born 1983), Israel soldier
- Gill Saunders (born 1956), American curator
- Gill Sims, British author and blogger
- Gill Smith (born 1965), English cricketer
- Gill Valentine, British geographer
- Gill White (1945–2020), British novelist and journalist
- Gill Wylie (born 1964/1965), Northern Irish football coach and player

=== Men ===
- Gill Bates, American international relations scholar specialized in Chinese foreign policy and politics
- Gill Byrd (born 1961), American professional football player
- Gill Dennis (1941–2015), American director and screenwriter
- Gill Dougherty (born 1961), French singer and songwriter
- Gill Fenerty (born 1963), American professional football player
- Gill Fox (1915–2004), American political cartoonist, comic book artist and editor, and animator
- Gill Holland (born 1964), American entrepreneur and film producer
- Gill Landry (born 1975), American singer-songwriter and guitarist
- Gill McLachlan (born 1973), Australian sports administrator
- Gill Sanderson, Author of romance novels
- Gill Mohindepaul Singh (born 1970), Indian-Hong Kong actor
- Gill Stegall (1961–1988), American professional football player
- Gill Swerts (born 1982), Belgian professional footballer
- Gill Verdon, Canadian physicist and entrepreneur
- Gill Robb Wilson (1892–1966), American pilot, Presbyterian minister, and military advocate
- Gill Warrenton (1894–1980), American silent and sound film cinematographer

== See also ==
- Gil (given name)
- Gil (surname)
