= Meredith Webber =

Australian novelist

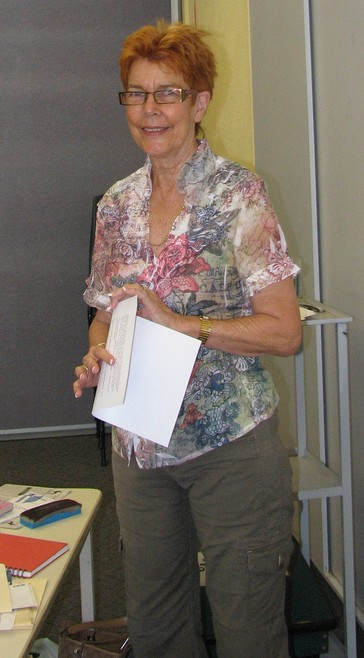
- Born: Australia
- Occupation: Novelist
- Writing career
- Period: 1994-Present
- Genre: Romantic novel

Meredith Webber is the author of over 100 contemporary romance novels. Many of her novels have been published as part of Mills and Boon's Medical Romance line of category romances. Her novels have been translated into dozens of languages, including Icelandic.

Before becoming a writer, Webber worked as a teacher, a travel agent, a pig farmer, and the coordinator of a respite care service. In 1992, she began to write medical romances. She allowed herself two years to become published, and within the first year she sold a novel. Since then, she has taught a romance writing course at Technical and Further Education College, helping her to analyze her own work.

== Bibliography ==
=== Novels ===
- Healing Love (1994)
- Whisper in the Heart (1994)
- A Different Destiny (1994)
- A Testing Time (1994)
- A Subtle Magic (1995)
- Unruly Heart (1995)
- Practice in the Clouds (1995)
- Flight into Love (1996)
- Courting Dr. Groves (1996)
- A Father for Christmas (1997)
- To Dr Cartwright, a Daughter (1998)
- Wedding at Gold Creek (1998)
- Miracles and Marriage (1998)
- One of the Family (1999)
- Heart-throb (1999)
- A Hugs-and-kisses Family (1999)
- Heart's Command (2000)
- Love Me (2000)
- Wedding Bells (2000)
- A Winter Bride (2000)
- An Enticing Proposal (2000)
- Baubles, Bells and Bootees (2000)
- Redeeming Dr. Hammond (2001)
- The Temptation Test (2001)
- A Very Precious Gift (2001)
- Christmas Knight (2002)
- Her Dr.Wright (2002)
- The Marriage Gamble (2002)
- A Woman Worth Waiting for (2002)
- Dr. Graham's Marriage (2002)
- Dear Doctor (2002)
- The Doctor's Destiny (2003)
- Outback Engagement (2003)
- The Pregnancy Proposition (2003)
- Daisy and the Doctor (2003)
- The Surgeon's Second Chance (2003)
- A Doctor's Christmas Family (2004)
- Doctors in Flight (2004)
- Doctor and Protector (2004)
- Doctors in Paradise (2004)
- The Children's Heart Surgeon (2005)
- The Greek Doctor's Rescue (2005)
- The Heart Surgeon's Proposal (2005)
- The Italian Surgeon (2005)
- Coming Home for Christmas (2005)
- Sheikh Surgeon (2005)
- Bride at Bay Hospital (2006)
- Father By Christmas (2006)
- The Spanish Doctor's Convenient Bride (2006)
- The Doctor's Marriage Wish (2006)
- His Runaway Nurse (2007)
- Nurse He's Been Waiting for (2007)
- A Pregnant Nurse's Christmas Wish (2007)

=== Wings of... ===
- Wings of Duty (1996)
- Wings of Passion (1996)
- Wings of Care (1997)
- Wings of Spirit (1997)
- Wings of Devotion (1997)
- Wings of Love (1997)

=== To Me ===
- Marry Me (2000)
- Trust Me (2000)

=== One Australian Doctor ===
- Claimed, One Wife (2001)
- Found, One Husband (2001)

=== Outback ===
- Outback Marriage (2003)
- Outback Encounter (2003)

=== Omnibus ===
- Doctors Down Under (2002) (with Marion Lennox, Alison Roberts)
- Small Miracles / Winter Bride (2004) (with Jennifer Taylor)
- Dedicated Lady / Wedding Bells (2005) (with Gill Sanderson)
- Gift-Wrapped Love (2006) (with Margaret Barker, Jennifer Taylor)
