= Clive Ballard =

British researcher

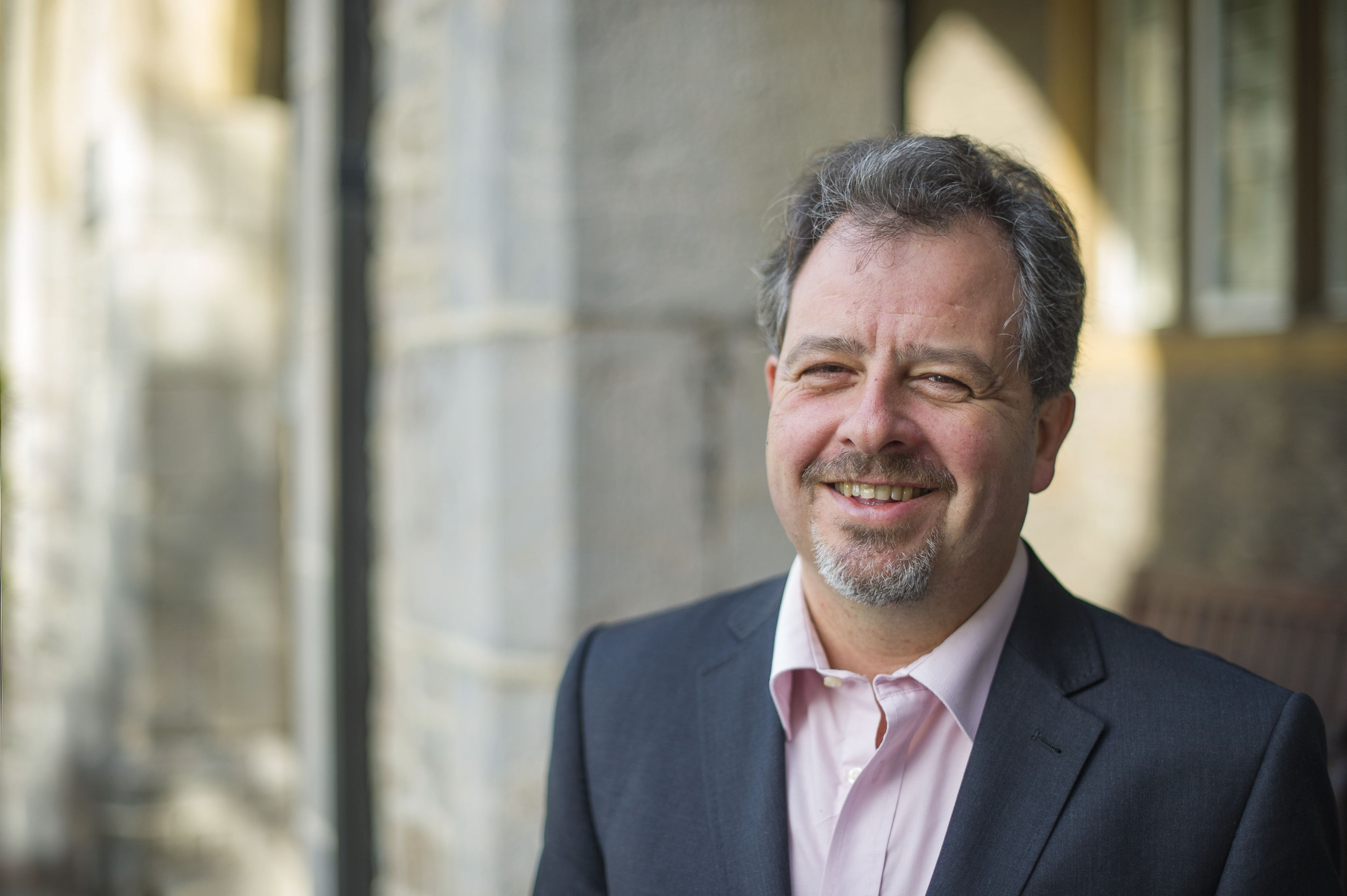
- Born: August 1964 (age 62)
- Education: University of Leicester
- Occupations: Pro-Vice Chancellor and Executive Dean
- Employer: University of Exeter
- Title: Professor of Age-Related Diseases

Clive Ballard (born August 1964) is a British, world-leading expert in dementia. He is currently professor of age-related diseases at the University of Exeter and interim deputy pro-vice-chancellor and dean of the University of Exeter Medical School.

Clive specialises in treatment of dementia with Lewy Bodies and Parkinson's disease, the harms of antipsychotic medications in people with dementia, the benefits of non-pharmacological treatments for the management of agitation in people with dementia and the prevention of dementia, including the development of the PROTECT programme of online interventions as a tool for maintaining cognitive health in later life. He has published more than 600 scientific papers and has an H index over 115, with more than 55,000 citations for his work.

== Early life and education ==
Clive Ballard was born in August 1964 in Wales, before studying medicine at the University of Leicester in 1987. He then studied psychiatry at the University of Birmingham in 1991 MD in neuropsychiatric symptoms in people with dementia, then moving on to specialise in the psychiatry of older adults. He moved to Newcastle in 1995 as an MRC clinical fellow and senior lecturer, joining the dementia with Lewy Bodies research group.

== Career and scholarly positions ==
In 2003, Ballard moved to the Institute of Psychiatry at King's College London as Professor of Age-Related Diseases. Here, he directed the National Institute for Health Research and Biomedical Research Unit for Dementia, and co-directed the Wolfson Centre for Age-Related Diseases.

From 2003 until 2013, Clive was also director of research at Alzheimer's Society, and played a key role in the successful campaign to overturn a decision made by the National Institute for Health and Care Excellence, making anti-dementia drugs available for people with dementia.

During this time, Clive published more than 200 research papers. These included key clinical trial focusing on the treatment of dementia with Lewy Bodies, dementia in people with Down's syndrome, vascular dementia, and neuropsychiatric symptoms in dementia.

In November 2016, Clive joined the University of Exeter Medical School as Pro-Vice Chancellor and Executive Dean of the Medical School.

== Scientific impact and recognition ==
=== Agitation in people with Alzheimer’s disease ===
In 2006, Ballard was involved in the development of a non-pharmacological training investigation to improve person-centred care for people with dementia in nursing homes. The investigation led to a 50% reduction in antipsychotic use, without worsening neuropsychiatric symptoms. In partnership with the Alzheimer's Society, this was developed into an intervention manual and has been implemented in 500 care homes across the UK.

=== Opportunities for dementia prevention ===
Ballard, working with The Lancet, was involved in the identification of the most important targets for dementia prevention interventions. This group also developed an online platform to enable the conduct of large randomized controlled trials of potential prevention interventions. With the MRC, Alzheimer's Society and BBC, Ballard conducted parallel trials in the UK to promote cognitive health in adults over the age of 50.

He was also heavily involved in the development of the PROTECT platform in the UK, an online cohort study, adopted as part of Dementia Platform UK. The platform conducts nested clinical trials and offers evidence based training to all participants. PROTECT has more than 25,000 UK participants, and has now been launched in the USA.

Ballard was elected a Fellow of the Academy of Medical Sciences in 2015.

== Major published works ==
- Clive Ballard, et al. Evaluation of the safety, tolerability, and efficacy of pimavanserin versus placebo in patients with Alzheimer's disease psychosis: a phase 2, randomised, placebo-controlled, double-blind study. The Lancet Neurology, Volume 17, Issue 3.
- ---., et al. Increased neural progenitors in vascular dementia. Neurobiology of Aging, Volume 32, Issue 12.
- ---., et al. The dementia antipsychotic withdrawal trial (DART-AD): long-term follow-up of a randomised placebo-controlled trial. The Lancet Neurology, Volume 8, Issue 2.
- ---., et al. Pimavanserin for patients with Parkinson's disease psychosis: a randomised, placebo-controlled phase 3 trial. The Lancet, Volume 383, Issue 9916.
- ---., et al. Diagnosis and management of dementia with Lewy bodies: third report of the DLB Consortium. Neurology, Dec 2005, 65 (12).
- ---., et al. Evaluation of the safety, tolerability, and efficacy of pimavanserin versus placebo in patients with Alzheimer's disease psychosis: a phase 2, randomised, placebo-controlled, double-blind study. The Lancet Neurology, Volume 17, Issue 3.
- ---., et al. Impact of person-centred care training and person-centred activities on quality of life, agitation, and antipsychotic use in people with dementia living in nursing homes: A cluster-randomised controlled trial. PLOS Medicine 15(2): e1002500.
- ---., et al. Cognitive decline in Parkinson disease. Nature Reviews Neurology, volume 13.
- ---., et al. Dementia prevention, intervention, and care. The Lancet, Volume 390, Issue 10113.
- ---., et al. Memantine for dementia in adults older than 40 years with Down's syndrome (MEADOWS): a randomised, double-blind, placebo-controlled trial. The Lancet, Volume 379, Issue 9815.
- ---., et al. Efficacy of treating pain to reduce behavioural disturbances in residents of nursing homes with dementia: cluster randomised clinical trial. BMJ 2011;343:d4065.
- ---., et al. Sertraline or mirtazapine for depression in dementia (HTA-SADD): a randomised, multicentre, double-blind, placebo-controlled trial. The Lancet, Volume 378, Issue 9789.
- ---., et al. Memantine in patients with Parkinson's disease dementia or dementia with Lewy bodies: a double-blind, placebo-controlled, multicentre trial. The Lancet Neurology, Volume 8, Issue 7.
- ---., et al. Donepezil for the Treatment of Agitation in Alzheimer's Disease. N Engl J Med 2007; 357:1382-1392.
- ---., et al. Putting brain training to the test. Nature, volume 465.
- ---., et al. Alzheimer's disease. The Lancet, Volume 377, Issue 9770.
- ---., et al. Neuroleptic drugs in dementia: benefits and harm. Nature Reviews, Neuroscience volume 7.
