= Gil (given name) =

Gil is a masculine given name. In English (/ɡɪl/, with hard g) it is often a diminutive form (hypocorism) of Gilbert. Another version of this name is Gill. In Spanish, Gil (Spanish pronunciation: [xil]) is the equivalent of English Giles, and as such a common baptismal name honouring Saint Giles.

It may refer to:

== People ==
- Gil Amelio (born 1943), technology executive and former CEO of Apple Inc.
- Gil Baiano (born 1966), Brazilian retired footballer
- Gil Bellows (born 1967), Canadian actor
- Gil Birmingham (born 1953), American actor
- Gil Brandt (1932–2023), American football executive
- Gil Brother (1957–2023), Brazilian actor, humorist, dancer and YouTuber
- Gil Cohen (disambiguation), several people
- Gil de Ferran (1967–2023), French-born Brazilian racing driver and team owner
- Gil Eanes, Portuguese explorer
- Gil Elvgren (1914-1980), American pin-up artist
- Gil Evans (1912-1988), Canadian jazz pianist, arranger, composer and bandleader
- Gil Fronsdal (born 1954), American Buddhist teacher
- Gil Gerard (born 1943), American actor, star of the TV series Buck Rogers in the 25th Century
- Gil Goldstein (born 1950), American jazz pianist
- Gil Gomes (born 1972), Portuguese retired footballer
- Gil Hayes (1939–2022), Canadian former professional wrestler
- Gil Heron (1922-2008), Jamaican footballer
- Gil Hodges (1924-1972), American Major League Baseball player and manager
- Gil Hovav (born 1962), Israeli TV presenter, culinary journalist, restaurant critic, and author
- Gil Kenan (born 1976), British–American film director
- Gil Kim (born 1981), American baseball coach and executive
- Gil Meche (born 1978), American retired Major League Baseball pitcher
- Gil Nickel (1939-2003), American vintner
- Gil Ofarim (born 1982), German singer and songwriter
- Gil Ofer (born 1976), Israeli Olympic judoka
- Gil Perkins (1907-1999), Australian actor
- Gilberto Ribeiro Gonçalves (born 1980), Brazilian footballer
- Gil Robinson (1910-1985), American football player
- Gil Santos (1938–2018), American radio commentator for the New England Patriots football team
- Gil Schwartz, pen name of Stanley Bing (1951–2020), business humorist and novelist
- Gil Shaham (born 1971), Israeli-American violinist
- Gil Shwed (born 1952), Israeli programmer and entrepreneur
- Gil Scott-Heron (1949-2011), American spoken word performer and rap pioneer
- Gil Semedo (born 1974), Cape Verdean singer
- Gil Simkovitch (born 1982), Israeli Olympic sport shooter
- Gil Stein (archaeologist), American archaeologist
- Gil Stein (ice hockey) (1928–2022), American lawyer, law instructor and former National Hockey League president
- Gil Student (born 1972), American blogger
- Gil Vainshtein (born 1984), Canadian soccer player

== Fictional characters ==
- Gil Blas, eponymous Spanish hero of an 18th-century French picaresque novel
- Gil Grissom, on the American TV series CSI: Crime Scene Investigation, played by actor William Petersen
- Gil Gunderson, a recurring character on the animated TV series The Simpsons
- Gil Chesterton, a supporting character on the TV sitcom Frasier
- Gil, in the 1985 arcade game The Tower of Druaga
- Gil, in the manga Dragon Knights
- Gil, on the American/Canadian children's TV series Bubble Guppies
- Gil Hammerstein from the video game Lights, Camera, Pants!
- Gil Shannon, the main character of the Sniper Elite novel series written by Scott McEwen
- Gil Nexdor, a Johnny Test character

== See also ==
- Gill (name)
