= The Worlds of Japanese Popular Culture =

1998 collection edited by D. P. Martinez

The Worlds of Japanese Popular Culture: Gender, Shifting Boundaries, and Global Cultures
- Editor: Dolores P. Martinez
- Genre: Edited collection
- Publisher: Cambridge University Press
- Publication date: September 1998
- Pages: xi, 212
- ISBN: 978-0-5216-3128-0
- OCLC: 38936581
- Text: The Worlds of Japanese Popular Culture: Gender, Shifting Boundaries, and Global Cultures at the Internet Archive

The Worlds of Japanese Popular Culture: Gender, Shifting Boundaries, and Global Cultures is a 1998 edited collection by Dolores P. Martinez published by Cambridge University Press.

== Development and contents ==
Martinez aimed to compose a work that represented a broad spectrum of cultural perspectives, and the contributors of the collection come from both Japan and several Western countries. Martinez also notes in her introduction that five of the ten have backgrounds in anthropology, and Doug Slaymaker, writing for Monumenta Nipponica, felt that the work as a whole takes a viewpoint with a particular emphasis on that field as a result.

The collection features four sections, the first including an introduction by Martinez and a chapter on sumo by Masao Yamaguchi. Martinez delineates the following sections of the work by discussion of gender. The second section, titled "The Male Domain", starts with an essay by Tom Gill discussing cultural narratives of superheroes across Japanese history. Bill Kelly proposes an argument for the popularity of karaoke in Japanese culture, and Isolde Standish's chapter draws comparison between the anime film Akira (1988) and bōsōzoku culture. Susan J. Napier contributes a chapter on shōjo manga that begins the third section, "The Female Domain". Tanaka Keiko examines the similarities in language between women's magazines and educational textbooks, and Paul Harvey writes on the themes of progressivism and traditionalism in Japanese television dramas. The closing section, "Shifting Boundaries", begins with an essay on the relationship between romance and existence as a public figure by Halldór Stefánsson. Nagashima Nobuhiro studies the formation of a cult following a Japanese racehorse. Finally, Jonathan Watts contributes an essay on the rising popularity of the J.League soccer competition.

Mark Schilling felt that Martinez allowed the contributing authors a relatively high degree of freedom when choosing their points of study; he wrote in his Japan Quarterly review that the section titles that had been chosen were so broad that they become "all but meaningless". Slaymaker wrote that a common theme connecting many of the chapters was the "tension between the traditional and the contemporary". Joy Hendry's review in the Japan Forum also identified gender, global culture, and several other recurring topics in the work.

== Reception ==
Several reviewers felt that the book was a useful addition to the body of scholarly work on Japanese popular culture. Slaymaker particularly appreciated that the collection included essays that both summarize useful primary sources and put forward original analyses. He felt that Martinez's introduction was "in many way the strongest piece in the work" by elucidating the state of the academic domain and contextualizing the subsequent monographs. Christine R. Yano commended Martinez's editorial efforts, noting in a review for The Journal of Asian Studies that several of the topics discussed in the collection had yet to have been studied in English-language literature at the time of publication. Ian Condry wrote in American Ethnologist that Napier's chapter was "one of the book's most provocative" in its examination of shōjo archetypes and its argument that the genre provides a contrasting option with traditional depictions of femininity in Western culture. While Schilling wrote positively of the work as a whole, he sharply criticized the first chapter written by Yamaguchi, pointing out several inaccuracies and contradictions with extant literature or sumo traditions. Jerry Eades, writing in the Journal of the Royal Anthropological Institute, concurred, calling it "disappointingly thin". Michael Schoenecke, however, echoed Schilling's argument that the book covered too wide a range of topics, "[stretching] almost to the breaking point." In a review for Anthropos, Christoph Brumann appreciated Gill's comparison of the Japanese superheroes such as Ultraman and Gridman with Superman, their reflection in American media. He also felt that it featured an "enjoyable dose of [...] irony."
