= Bob Gill =

Bob Gill may refer to:

- Bob Gill (artist) (1931–2021), American illustrator and graphic designer
- Bob Gill (daredevil) (born 1945), American former world-record holding motorcycle stuntman
- Bobby Gill (1959–2024), American NASCAR driver
