= Minna P. Gill =

American librarian and suffragist

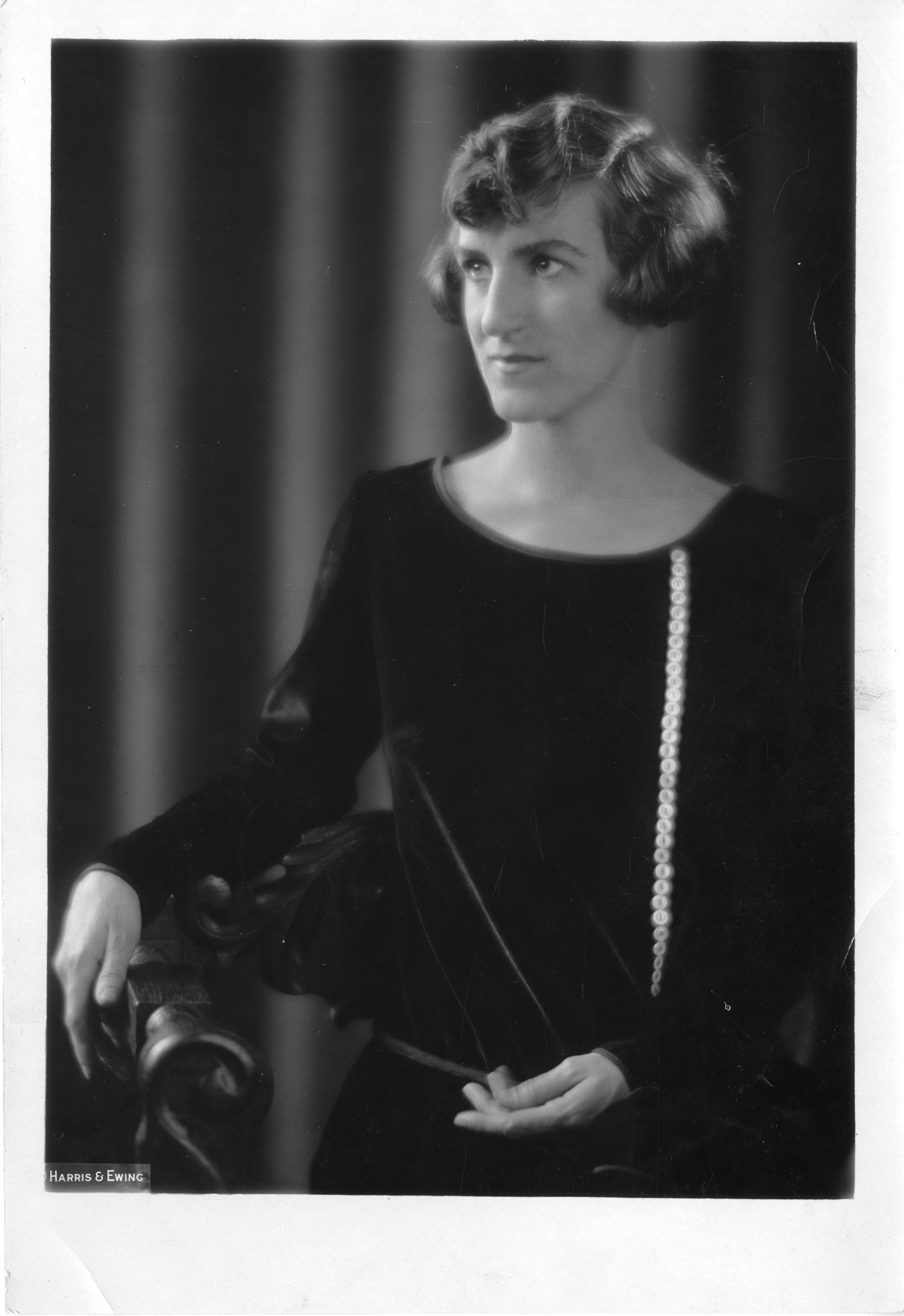
- Born: January 7, 1896
- Died: January 18, 1964 (aged 68)
- Occupation: librarian
- Parents: DeLancey W. Gill (father); Mary Wright Gill (mother)

Minna Partridge Gill (January 7, 1896 – January 18, 1964) was an American librarian and suffragist.

Gill was a Washington D.C. native who was active in the women's suffrage movement and participated in many demonstrations for women's rights in the 1910s.

Gill was the daughter of scientific illustrators DeLancey Walker Gill and Mary Irvin Wright Gill. She was named for her grandmother Minna Partridge Wright. She attended George Washington University, and received a B.B.A. from the University of Texas where her thesis was Trade investigations, as conducted through merchandising departments of newspapers.

She worked as a librarian during the 1920s and 1930s, working for Science Service. Science Service (now called Society for Science) was an organization also known as The Institution for the Popularization of Science; it was organized under the auspices of the National Academy of Sciences, the National Research Council and the American Association for the Advancement of Science. They published a regular newsletter and would publish material from the scientific community straight to microfilm to make it available without using up paper or library shelf space. Gill was the organization's sole librarian, preparing various bibliographies about the meat industry in the United States and freight rates for agriculture as two examples. She also contributed to a straight-to-microfilm book that collected packing industry pamphlets of the times. Gill oversaw the "biographical morgue" of notable scientists and other famous people which Gill estimated covered 10,000 people in 1940. The organization was reported to have a library of approximately 6,000 volumes in 1934.

Gill later worked in the Smithsonian Institution library starting in 1942 when she was appointed assistant librarian in charge of the catalog. She retired in 1955 as chief of the catalog section.

Gill was an amateur artist and active in the Washington Arts Club and the alumni association for Alpha Phi sorority. She was a member of the Daughters of the American Revolution which she joined in 1919.
