= Jennifer Taylor (writer) =

British novelist

- Born: 1 January 1949 (age 77); England
- Occupation: Novelist
- Writing career
- Period: 1988 – September 2017
- Genre: Romantic novel
- Website: www.jennifer-taylor.com

Jennifer Taylor (born 1 January 1949 in England) is a popular British writer of 50 medical romance novels published by Mills & Boon since 1988.

== Biography ==
Jennifer Taylor born on 1 January 1949 in England. She is a Chartered Librarian and worked for many years in scientific research. When she discovered medical romance books, she decided to write.

She lives in the northwest of England with her husband and her dog. She loves reading and travel.

== Bibliography ==
=== Single novels ===
- Final Score (1988)
- Unexpected Challenge (1989)
- A Magical Touch (1989)
- Tender Pursuit (1989)
- Lease on Love (1990)
- Lovespell (1990)
- Guilty of Love (1992)
- Love Is a Risk (1992)
- Old Love, New Love (1992)
- Fox Tales (1992)
- Destined to Love (1992)
- Love Is the Answer (1993)
- Promise Me Love (1993)
- Spanish Nights (1994)
- Playing at Love (1994)
- Chase a Dream (1994)
- Lovestorm (1994)
- Jungle Fever (1995)
- Desert Moon (1995)
- Tides of Love (1995)
- The Pleasures of the Table (1996)
- Enticed (1996)
- Rachel's Child (1997)
- Wife for Real (1997)
- Take One Bachelor (1998)
- Marrying Her Partner (1999)
- Our New Mummy (1999)
- Home at Last (1999)
- The Husband She Needs (1999)
- Small Miracles (2000)
- Someone to Trust (2000)
- Greater Than Riches (2000)
- A Real Family Christmas (2000)
- Adam's Daughter (2001)
- An Angel in His Arms (2001)
- The Baby Issue (2001)
- His Brother's Son (2002)
- A Family of Their Own (2002)
- Home by Christmas (2002)
- The Doctor's Christmas Gift (2003)
- A Very Special Marriage (2003)
- Saving Dr. Cooper (2003)
- The Pregnant Surgeon (2003)
- The Midwife's New Year Wish (2004)
- Surgeon in Crisis (2004)
- A Special Kind of Caring (2005)
- The Forever Assignment (2005)
- Nurse in a Million (2005)
- The Consultant's Adopted Son (2006)
- A Baby of His Own (2006)
- A Night to Remember (2006)
- The Woman He's Been Waiting for (2006)
- In His Loving Care (2006)

=== General Dalverston Hospital ===
1. Tender Loving Care (2000)
2. For Ben's Sake (2000)
3. A Very Special Child (2001)
4. Touched by Angels (2001)
5. The Italian Doctor (2001)
6. Morgan's Son (2002)

=== Heartbeat Series multi-author ===
- Life Support (2002)

=== A & E Drama Series multi-author ===
- Rapid Response (2004)

=== The Carlyon Sisters Series ===
1. Dr Constantine's Bride (2007)
2. Dr Ferrero's Baby Secret (2007)

=== Omnibus In Collaboration ===
- A Child for Christmas (2003) (with Carole Mortimer and Rebecca Winters)
- Small Miracles / Winter Bride (2004) (with Meredith Webber)
- Gift-Wrapped Love (2006) (with Margaret Barker and Meredith Webber)
