= Mary Gill =

Mary Gill may refer to:

- Mary Gabriel Gill (1837–1905), New Zealand Catholic prioress
- Mary Louise Gill, American professor of classics and philosophy
- Mary James Gill (born 1985), Pakistani politician
- Mary Wright Gill (1867–1929), American scientific illustrator
- Mary Gill (Illinois politician)
- Mary Gill, English wife of sculptor, letter cutter, typeface designer, and printmaker Eric Gill
