= University of Ballarat =

Former university in Victoria, Australia

- Former names: Ballarat School of Mines; Ballarat Junior Technical School; Ballarat Teachers' College; State College of Victoria Ballarat; Ballarat Institute of Advanced Education; Ballarat College of Advanced Education; Ballarat University College
- Type: Public
- Active: 1870–2013
- Location: Main campus, Lydiard Street South, Ballarat, Victoria, Australia; 37.626°S 143.891°E
- Language: English
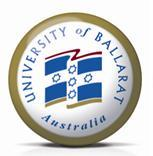

The University of Ballarat, Australia was a dual-sector university with multiple campuses in Victoria, Australia, including its main Ballarat campus, Melbourne, Sydney, and Adelaide that were authorized by the university to provide diploma, undergraduate and postgraduate programs. The university offered traditional programs, including business, information technology, building and construction, engineering, mining, education, social sciences, nursing, hospitality, and art.

The University of Ballarat's history goes back to the gold rush era of the 1850s. It began as a tertiary school in 1870. In 1970, Founders Theatre was built at the Mt Helen campus after an appeal was made to commemorate the opening of the school 100 years earlier. The theatre opened in 1981.

The University of Ballarat was formed from a number of varying types of schools. The earliest was the School of Mines in 1870, which subsequently merged with other related organizations. Another was through Ballarat Base Hospital School of Nursing (1888). Ballarat College of Advanced Education was formed in 1976 with what began as a teacher's college in 1926, and Ballarat Institute of Advanced Education, which began in 1967 when it split from the School of Mines.

The university merged with Monash University's Gippsland (Churchill) campus in 2013, under the new name Federation University Australia.

== History ==
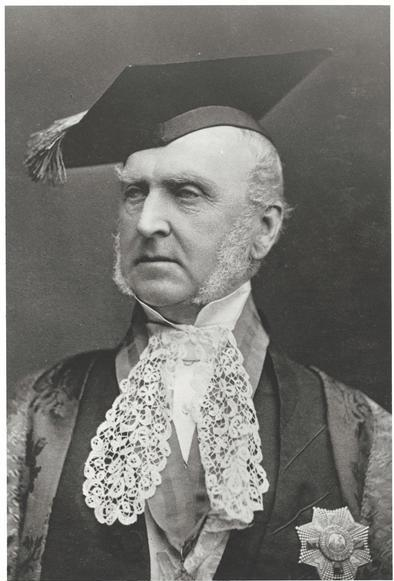
Sir Redmond Barry, the first president of the School of Mines, a colonial judge in Victoria, and the inaugural Chancellor of the University of Melbourne

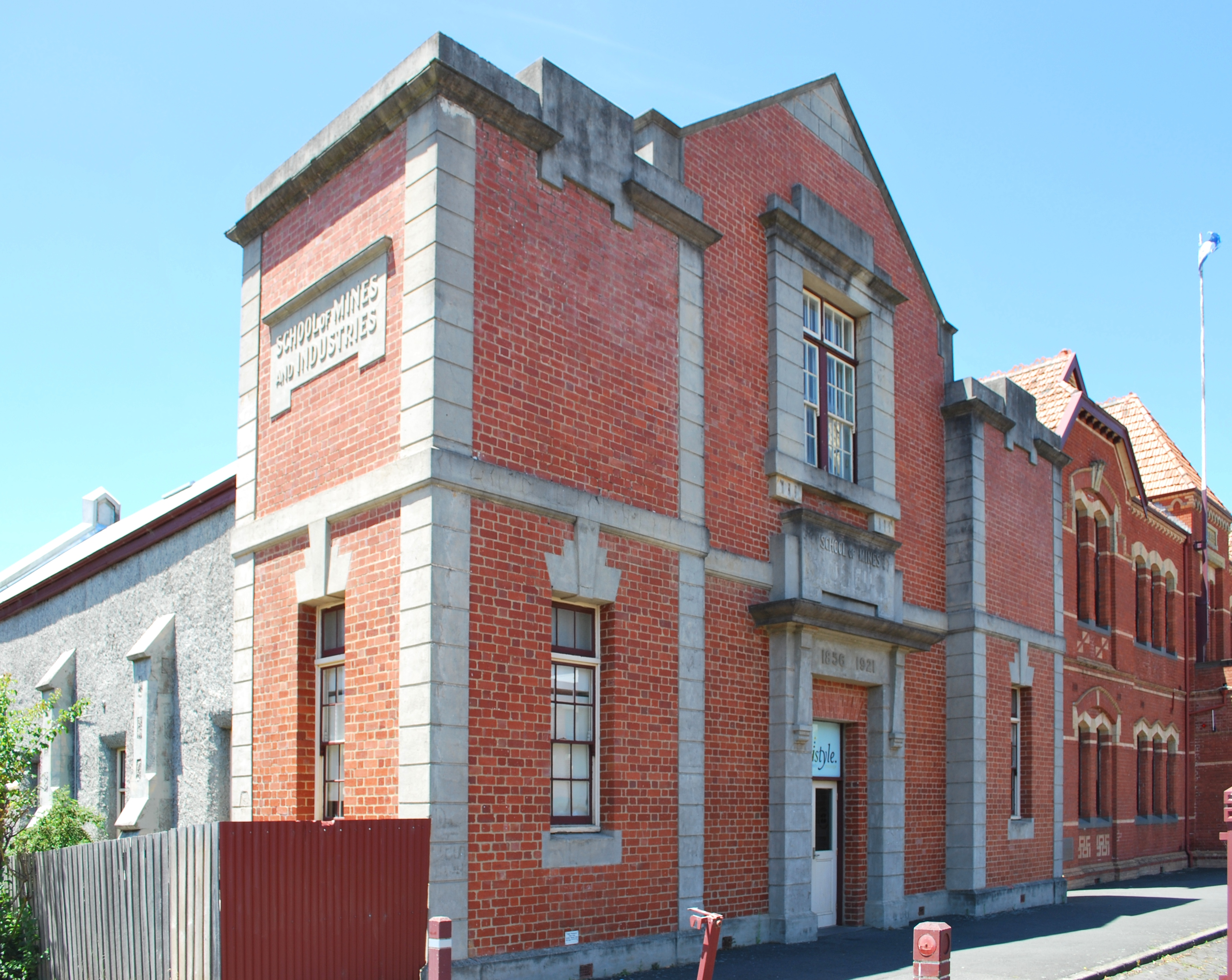
School of Mines, Ballarat

=== School of Mines ===
Tertiary education at Ballarat began with the establishment of the Ballarat School of Mines in 1870, making it Australia's third oldest tertiary institution. Redmond Barry was its first president, and he was involved in the creation of university degree level courses for the school. The School of Mines had two divisions - a tertiary division and a technical division. The tertiary division provided higher education courses such as mining engineering, geology, education and business studies, while the technical division provided such programs as wool classing, plumbing and bricklaying.

The organisation remained in that form until 1967 when it was split into three institutions, Ballarat School of Industries, Ballarat Technical School, and Ballarat Institute of Advanced Education. They remained three entities until 1976. Ballarat Institute of Advanced Education merged into Ballarat College of Advanced Education. The Ballarat School of Industries and Ballarat Technical School merged into the School of Mines and Industries, Ballarat (SMB) in 1976.

Several entities merged or had arrangements with SMB. In 1994, a memo of understanding (MOU) was signed between SMB and the Ararat Technical School, which was founded in 1969. Then, in 1998, SMB and the Horsham-based Wimmera Institute of TAFE (1984), dating back to 1882, (Note: The Wimmera Institute of TAFE was formed in 1984 with the merger of the Stawell Technical School (1926), which dated back to the founding of Stawell School of Design in 1882, and the Horsham Technical School (1958), which began as the Horsham Working Men’s College in 1891.) merged into the University of Ballarat to create a larger University.

=== Ballarat College of Advanced Education ===
In 1976, the Ballarat College of Advanced Education (Ballarat CAE) was formed with the merger of the Ballarat Institute of Advanced Education (1967) with the State College of Victoria, Ballarat—that began as Ballarat Teachers' College in 1926.

The Dawkins Revolution of the late 1980s saw a merger of large metropolitan colleges of advanced education with universities, and although the college struggled with the options, it chose to remain as a CAE. (Note: Larger metropolitan colleges were opting for mergers with existing universities, such as Chisholm Institute of Technology with Monash University, Melbourne College of Advanced Education with Melbourne University, Philip Institute of Technology with RMIT University, Lincoln Institute of Health Science and Bendigo College of Advanced Education with La Trobe University, and Victoria College and Warrnambool Institute of Advanced Education with Geelong's Deakin University, Ballarat was faced with the prospect of merging with Deakin University, an option the board of Ballarat CAE did not want to accept, arguing in the words of the then director Professor John Sharpham, that "Deakin is not strong" and who attempted to arrange a merger of "equal sides" where Ballarat CAE, Warrnambool IAE, and Deakin would merge to become the University of Western Victoria. Under this arrangement, Ballarat would get 50% of voting power, with Geelong and Warrnambool the other 50%. The proposal was rejected by Deakin, which left Ballarat CAE as the only college in Victoria not to become a university.)

=== Ballarat University College ===
Ballarat University College was formed in 1990, and became an affiliated college of the University of Melbourne. Its name was changed to "Ballarat University College, an affiliated College of the University of Melbourne", the actual name used on graduates' testamurs. (Note: At this point it seemed that BUC would become the Ballarat campus of Melbourne University, which would have given it a sizable rural campus in Western Victoria. This, however, did not eventuate, with some critics suggesting that it was too prestigious.)

Ballarat University College then sought to become a fully-fledged university in its own right when Professor John Sharpham asked the board of BUC why, if Southern Cross University was allowed to separate from the University of New England by becoming a university in its own right, Ballarat should not be allowed to do the same. The Federal Government was lobbied and responded by sending three Vice-Chancellors (one of them, incidentally, being from the University of New England) to Ballarat to consider the matter. The result was favorable and the university college became a university in 1994. Its sole link to the University of Melbourne was that Melbourne would observe the academic standards at the new university for a five-year period.

=== University of Ballarat ===
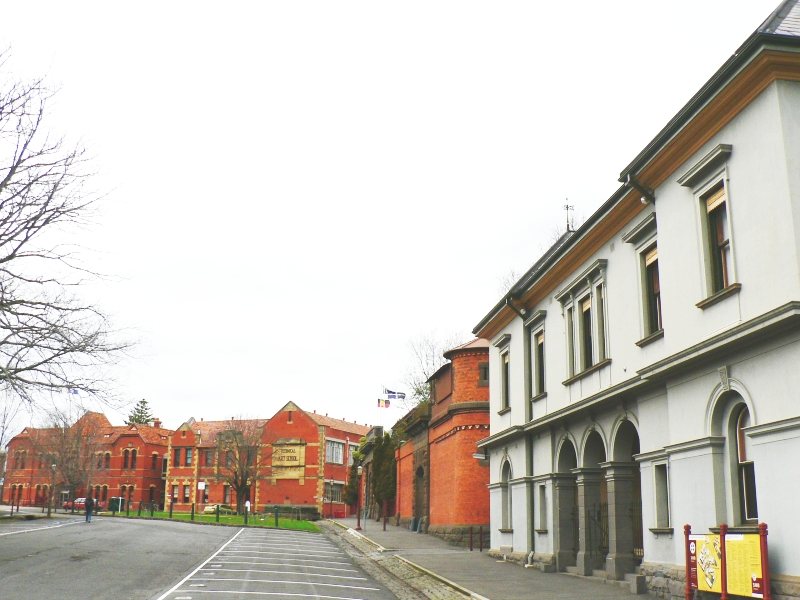
University of Ballarat campus

The University of Ballarat was organised in 1994, after being sponsored by the University of Melbourne for five years, and due to the passage of the University of Ballarat Act 1993 (No. 107 of 1993) by the Parliament of Victoria.

In 1998, the Ballarat School of Mines and Industries (1870) and the Horsham-based Wimmera Institute of TAFE were merged into the university by the University of Ballarat (Amendment) Act 1997 (No. 79 of 1997), expanding its curriculum.

The university's English and Academic Preparation (EAP) prepared international students for a university education in Australia and improved student's ability to read, write, speak, and listen to the English language. The Ballarat had five campuses, and it offered traditional university programs, including business, information technology, building and construction, engineering, mining, education, social sciences, nursing, hospitality, and art. In addition to traditional classroom learning, the school offered online learning courses.

According to the university's records, there were 25,810 students consisting of 13,820 higher education students and 11,990 technical and further education students in 2008. Of the total student population, 11,460 students were at the Ballarat campus. There were 6,145 master's students, as compared to the 6,048 bachelor students. There were 12,481 students located off-campus, based on partnerships with partnership institutions.

The university was a member of the Association of Commonwealth Universities. All transcripts issued by the university are accredited by Australian Core Skills Framework and Australian Qualifications Framework.

The school achieved a 5-star rating for teaching quality in the 2013 and 2014 edition of The Good Universities Guide. The same survey showed that graduates gave the school a 4-star rating for its ability to teach general skills, cultural diversity, graduation success, and the aided in their ability to get a job.

=== Merger to Federation University Australia ===
The university merged with Monash University's Gippsland (Churchill) campus in 2013, and the merged schools are now the Federation University Australia. The name change was made as the result of the passage of a bill to amend the University of Ballarat Act 2010 through the state's parliament. Its name no longer carries the name of Ballarat because the intention is not to be limiting geographically. It also wanted to reflect its intention to continue offering education to domestic and international students. Students who were enrolled at the time of the merger and name change were allowed to choose the name of the institution shown on their graduation documents. The name change went into effect on 1 January 2014.

== Notable alumni ==
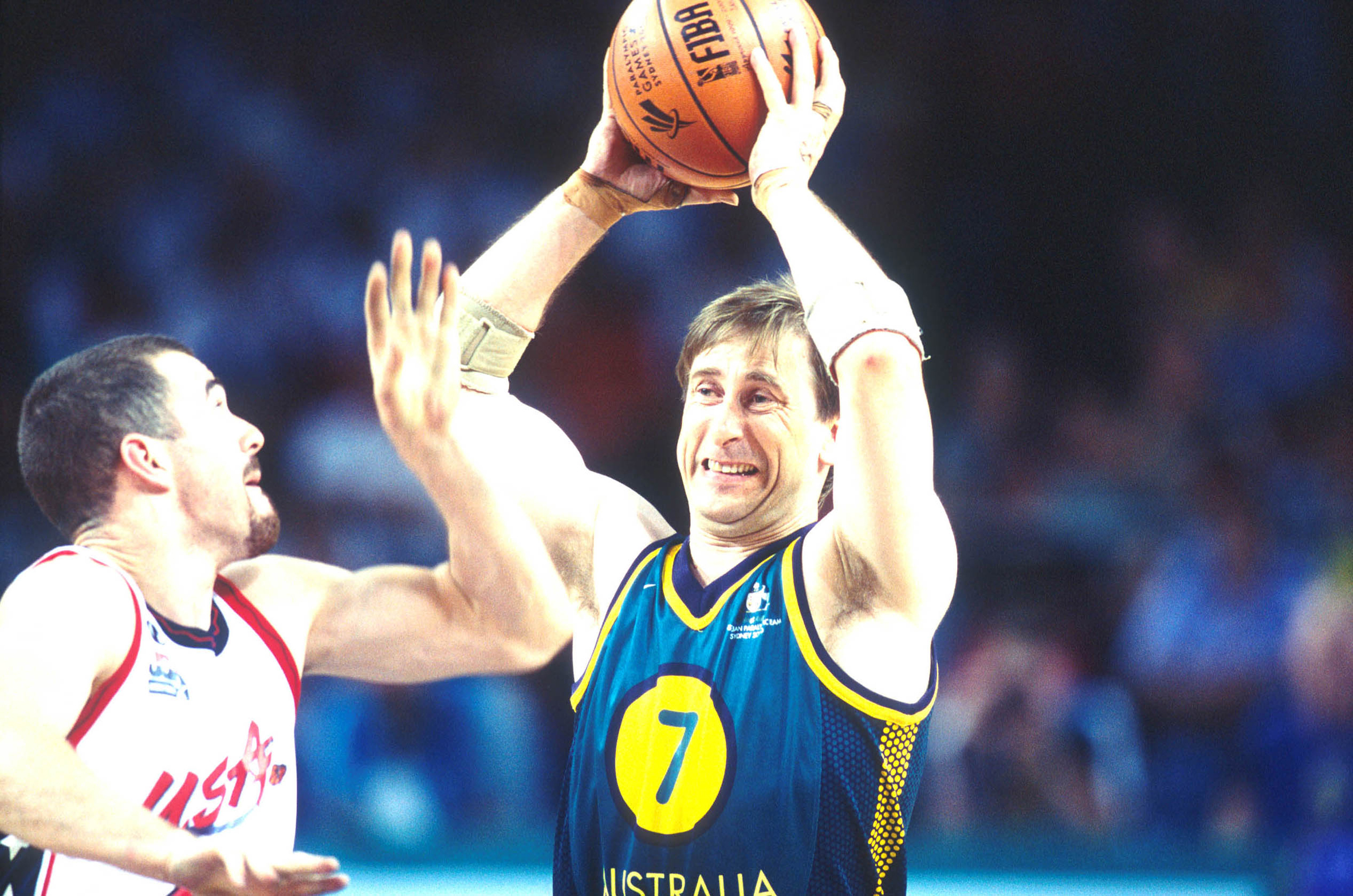
Sandy Blythe (1962 – 2005) in action during competition at the 2000 Summer Paralympics, Sydney

- David Noonan, Australian artist who lives and works in London
- Aunty Donna, absurdist sketch comedy troupe
- Sandy Blythe, wheelchair basketball player
- Dr. Cyril P. Callister, an Australian chemist and food technologist
- Jacqueline Dark, opera singer
- Keith Hamilton, former Minister for Agriculture and former Minister for Aboriginal Affairs
- William Roy Hodgson, Human Rights Diplomat
- Will Longstaff
- Isolde Standish is an Australian and British Humanities Scholar and Film theorist specialised in East Asia.

== See also ==
- List of universities in Australia
- Federation University Australia
