= Anthony Gill (political scientist) =

American political scientist (born 1964)

Anthony James Gill (born July 17, 1964) is an American political scientist and adjunct professor of sociology at the University of Washington; he is a non-resident scholar at the Baylor University Institute for the Study of Religion. Gill specializes in political economy, comparative politics and religion. He obtained his PhD (1994) and MA (1989) from the University of California, Los Angeles. He is a member of the Mont Pelerin Society and the Philadelphia Society, and a visiting scholar and frequent contributor to the American Institute for Economic Research.

== Theoretical approach and teaching ==
Gill argues that religious activity will be higher in countries with lower levels of public sector welfare assistance. Building upon economic theory, he argues that state-sponsored social welfare substitutes for the traditional welfare services provided by churches. His analysis focuses on Christian nations in Europe and Latin America. Gill's current research agenda includes how local governments regulate church growth via property rights regulations and religion as a mechanism of social governance. Gill has appeared on EconTalk discussing religion and tipping. Gill attends the Duvall Church (Evangelical Methodist) in rural east King County (Duvall, WA).

"Tony Gill demonstrates that there are no boundaries between scholarship, classroom teaching and the many extracurricular contributions that provide students with the personal touch and the experiential learning opportunities that make a great research university a great place to learn."
- University of Washington Political Science Professor W. Lance Bennett

== Publications ==
Books

- Rendering Unto Caesar: The Catholic Church and the State in Latin America (University of Chicago Press, 1998)
- The Political Origins of Religious Liberty (Cambridge University Press, 2007)

Articles

- 2023. "The Dynamic Efficiency of Gifting." Journal of Institutional Economics 19 (1): 70–85. Co-authored with Michael D. Thomas.
- 2021. "The Comparative Endurance and Efficiency of Religion." Public Choice 189: 313–34.
- N.D. "Septics, Sewers and Secularization: How Government Regulation Flushes Religiosity Down the Drain."
- 2006. “Will a Million Muslims March? Muslim Interest Organization and Political Integration in Europe.” Co-authored with Steven Pfaff. Comparative Political Studies 39 (7): 803–28.
- 2005. “The Political Origins of Religious Liberty.” Interdisciplinary Journal of Research on Religion 1 (1): 1-35.
- 2002. “A Political Economy of Religion.” In Sacred Markets, Sacred Canopies: Essays on Religious Markets and Religious Pluralism, ed. Ted G. Jelen. Lanham: Rowman-Littlefield.
- 2001. “Religion and Comparative Politics.” Annual Review of Political Science 4: 117–38.

== Awards ==
- 2009: Distinguished Book Award, American Sociological Association's Section on Religion, for The Political Origins of Religious Liberty
- 1999: Distinguished Teaching Award, The University of Washington
- 1999: Best Paper Award, APSA Section on Religion and Politics, for “Religion and Political Attitudes in Latin America: Evidence from the World Values Survey”
