= John Gill =

John Gill may refer to:

== Sports ==
- John Gill (cricketer) (1854–1888), New Zealand cricketer
- John Gill (coach) (1898–1997), American football coach
- John Gill (footballer, born 1903), English professional footballer
- John Gill (American football) (born 1986), American football defensive tackle
- John Gill (footballer, born 1941), Australian rules footballer for Carlton
- John Gill (footballer, born 1932) (1932–2003), Australian rules footballer for Essendon
- John Gill (climber) (born 1937), American mathematician famed for his rock-climbing, especially bouldering

== Politics ==
- John Gill (Australian politician) (1823–1889), New South Wales colonial politician
- John Gill Jr. (1850–1918), U.S. Representative from Maryland
- John Gill (trade unionist) (1898–1971), Irish trade unionist and Labour TD

== Religion ==
- John Gill (theologian) (1697–1771), English Baptist minister and Calvinist theologian
- John Glanville Gill (1909–1979), Unitarian minister, scholar, and civil rights activist

== Other ==
- John Gill (printer) (1732–1785), American printer and co-owner of the Boston Gazette
- John Elkington Gill (1821–1874), 19th-century architect
- John Gill (judge) (died 1899), Manx Deemster
- John Gill (actor) (1912–2007), Welsh character actor
- John Gill, an important fictional character in "Patterns of Force", an episode of Star Trek

== See also ==
- Johnny Gill (disambiguation)
- John Gill Shorter (1818–1872), Democratic governor of Alabama
