= Isolde Standish =

Australian-British academic of East Asia

- Education: University of Ballarat

Isolde Standish is an Australian and British academic film theorist who specialises on East Asia (mainly Japan and South Korea). Mostly known for her works on Japanese Cinema, she is currently an Emerita Reader (Professor Emeritus) at the School of Oriental and African Studies (SOAS) in London, England and teaches Post-War Cinema and the Avant-Garde at the Tokyo University of Foreign Studies. Standish mostly works in Japan, South Korea and the United Kingdom. She has been awarded numerous prizes and grants, including the Ouseley Memorial Scholarship, a Japan Foundation scholarship, an AHRC Research Leave Award and a Leverhulme Trust Major Research Fellowship in 2014.

== Early life and education ==
Standish obtained a Bachelor of Arts in Humanities and Social Sciences in 1983 from the Ballarat College of Advanced Education (now Federation University Australia), a public dual-sector university based in Ballarat (Victoria, Australia) and a PhD from the School of Oriental and African Studies, a constituent college of the University of London.

== Career ==
Standish has held teaching positions in Japan. She also worked as an emerita Reader in 'Film and Media Studies' with the Japan and Korea Section of the East Asian Languages and Culture Department and a member of the Centre for Creative Industries, Media and Screen Studies at the School of Oriental and African Studies, in London. She worked within the Centre of Korean Studies and the Japan Research Centre (JRC). At SOAS, she has been the lead convenor for the master's degree in Global Cinemas and the Transcultural and supervised a number of PhD students. In 2018, Standish accepted the Ishibashi Foundation Visiting Professorship in Japanese Art History at Heidelberg University.

== Selected bibliography ==
=== Authored books ===
- Standish, Isolde (2011), Politics, Porn and Protest: Japanese Avant-Garde Cinema in the 1960s and 1970s. New York: Continuum International Publishing Group.
- Standish, Isolde (2005), A New History of Japanese Cinema: A Century of Narrative Film. New York: Continuum.
- Standish, Isolde (2000), Myth and Masculinity in the Japanese Cinema: Towards a Political Reading of the Tragic Hero. London: Curzon.

=== Articles ===
- Standish, Isolde (2015), 'The Revolutionary Triptych'. Kiju Yoshida: Love and Anarchism, pp 29–43.
- Standish, Isolde (2012), 'The Ephemeral as Transcultural Aesthetic: a Contextualization of the Early Films of Ozu Yasujiro'. Journal of Japanese and Korean Cinema, (4) 1, pp 3–14.
- Standish, Isolde (2011), 'The jidaigeki television series: myth, iteration and the domestication of the samurai hero'. Japan Forum, (23) 3, pp 431–440.
- Standish, Isolde (2010), 'Night and Fog in Japan: Fifty Years On'. Journal of Japanese and Korean Cinema, (1) 2, pp 143–155.
- Standish, Isolde (2006), 'Film and Narrative in the Yakuza Genre'. Cinemaya, (1) 2, pp 20–23.
- Standish, Isolde (2005) 'Chushingura and the Japanese Studio System'. Japan Forum, (17) 1, pp 69–86.
- Standish, Isolde (2005), 'Mediators of Modernity: 'Photo-Interpreters' in Japanese Silent Cinema'. Oral Tradition, (20) 1, pp 93–110.
- Standish, Isolde (1993), 'Korean Cinema and the New Realism: Text and Context'. East-West Film Journal, (7) 2, pp 54–80.

=== Edited books or journals ===
- Standish, Isolde, (ed.), (2014), Journal of Japanese and Korean Cinema. Volume 6, Number 1, May 2014. Oxford: Routledge.

=== Book chapters ===
- Standish, Isolde (2007) 'Transgression and the Politics of Porn. Oshima Nagisa's In the Realm of the Senses (1976)'. In: Phillips, A. and Stringer, J., (eds.), Japanese Cinema: Texts and Contexts. Abingdon: Routledge, pp 217–228.
- Standish, Isolde (1998) 'Akira: Postmodernism and Resistance'. In: Martinez, D.P., (ed.), The Worlds of Japanese Popular Culture: Gender, Shifting Boundaries, and Global Cultures. Cambridge: Cambridge University Press, pp 56–74.
