= Thomas Gill =

Thomas or Tom Gill may refer to:

- Thomas Gill (1788–1861), British Whig politician and industrialist
- Thomas Gill (architect) (1870–1941), American architect
- Thomas Gill (footballer) (born 1965), Norwegian football goalkeeper
- Thomas Gill (politician) (1922–2009), U.S. Representative from Hawaii, Lieutenant Governor of Hawaii
- Thomas Andrew Gill (1886–1947), American football and baseball player, coach of football, basketball, and baseball
- Thomas Edward Gill (1908–1973), American Roman Catholic bishop
- Tom Gill (actor) (1916–1971), British actor
- Tom Gill (anthropologist) (born 1960), Japan-based social anthropologist
- Tom Gill (artist) (1913–2005), cartoonist and comic book artist best known for The Lone Ranger
- Tom Gill (public servant) (1849–1923), Under-Treasurer in South Australia
- Tom Gill (writer) (1891–1972), American forester, fiction and non-fiction author, and editor of psychiatry journal
- T. P. Gill (1858–1931), Irish politician
- Frank Gill (politician) (Thomas Francis Gill, 1917–1982), New Zealand air force pilot and politician
- Harry Gill (politician) (Thomas Harry Gill, 1885–1955), British politician
