= David Noonan (artist) =

Australian artist (born 1969)

David Noonan (born 1969) is an Australian artist who lives and works in London.

His work was shown at Tate Modern in 2006.

== Early life and education ==
Noonan was born in Ballarat, Victoria, Australia. He received his BFA (Painting) in 1989 from Ballarat University College and his MFA in 1992 from Victorian College of the Arts, Melbourne.

== Work ==
His work was included in the March 2020 Adelaide Biennial of Australian Art at the Art Gallery of South Australia, which was titled "Monster Theatres".

== Solo exhibitions ==
2020

- Stagecraft, Art Gallery of Ballarat, Ballarat, VIC, Australia

2019

- Tapestries, Anna Schwartz Gallery, Melbourne, VIC, Australia
- A Dark and Quiet Place, Fremantle Arts Centre, Fremantle, WA, Australia

2018

- A Dark and Quiet Place, Gertrude Contemporary, Melbourne, VIC, Australia

2017

- A Dark and Quiet Place, Modern Art, London

2016

- Lead Light, Roslyn Oxley9 Gallery, Sydney, NSW, Australia

2015

- Roslyn Oxley9 Gallery, Sydney, NSW, Australia
- Rosenwald-Wolf Gallery, University of the Arts, Philadelphia, PA, USA
- Xavier Hufkens, Brussels, Belgium

2014

- Au 8, Rue Saint-Bon, Paris, France

2013

- Foxy Production, New York, NY, USA
- Collages, Au 8, Rue Saint-Bon, Paris, France
- Roslyn Oxley9 Gallery, Sydney, NSW, Australia

2012

- Modern Art, London
- Origami, Xavier Hufkens, Brussels, Belgium

2011

- Contemporary Art Museum, St. Louis, MO, USA
- Roslyn Oxley9 Gallery, Sydney, NSW, Australia

2010

- David Kordansky Gallery, Los Angeles, CA, USA
- SPIEL, Washington Garcia (off-site), The Mitchell Library, Glasgow

2009

- Australian Centre for Contemporary Art, Melbourne, VIC, Australia

2008

- Baronian Francey, Brussels, Belgium
- Chisenhale Gallery, London
- MARKUS, Roslyn Oxley9 Gallery, Sydney, NSW, Australia
- Art : Concept, Paris, France

2007

- Palais de Tokyo, Paris, France

2006

- David Kordansky Gallery, Los Angeles, CA, USA

2005

- Images, Roslyn Oxley9 Gallery, Sydney, NSW, Australia
- Four New Films, Govett-Brewster Art Gallery, New Plymouth, New Zealand
- Films and Paintings 2001–2005, Monash University Museum of Art, Melbourne, VIC, Australia
- HOTEL, London

2004

- they became what they beheld, Foxy Production, New York, NY, USA
- they became what they beheld, Three Walls, Chicago, IL, USA
- Paintings, Uplands Gallery, Melbourne, VIC, Australia

2003

- Before and Now, Roslyn Oxley9 Gallery, Sydney, NSW, Australia
- Miriam Hall, (with Starlie Geikie), Clubs Projects Inc., Melbourne, VIC, Australia
- SOWA (with Simon Trevaks), Artspace, Sydney, NSW, Australia
- SOWA (solo and collaboration with Simon Trevaks), Foxy Production, New York, NY, USA

2002

- Waldhaus, Uplands Gallery, Melbourne, VIC, Australia
- The Likening (with Simon Trevaks), Roslyn Oxley9 Gallery, Sydney, NSW, Australia

2001

- The Likening (with Simon Trevaks), Studio 12, 200 Gertrude Street, Melbourne, VIC, Australia

2000

- more apt to be lost than got (with Simon Trevaks), Roslyn Oxley9 Gallery, Sydney, NSW, Australia

1998

- Saturn Return, 1st Floor, Melbourne, VIC, Australia

1997

- head on, Karyn Lovegrove Gallery, Melbourne, VIC, Australia
- head on, Centre for Contemporary Art, Adelaide, SA, Australia

1995

- Karyn Lovegrove Gallery, Melbourne, VIC, Australia

1993

- POOL, Karyn Lovegrove Gallery, Melbourne, VIC, Australia
- Type 1-36, 200 Gertrude Street, Melbourne, VIC, Australia

== Selected collections ==
Gallery of Ballarat, Ballarat, VIC, Australia

Art Gallery of New South Wales, Sydney, NSW, Australia

Art Gallery of Ontario, Toronto, Canada

Art Gallery of South Australia, Adelaide, SA, Australia

Art Gallery of Western Australia, Perth, WA, Australia

British Council, London

CAA Art Museum, China Art Academy, Hangzhou, China

Center for Curatorial Studies, Bard College, Annandale-on-Hudson, NY, USA

Charles Riva Collection, Brussels, Belgium

City of Stonnington, Melbourne, VIC, Australia

Dallas Museum of Art, Dallas, TX, USA

Depart Foundation, Rome, Italy

Galerie de l’UQAM, Montréal, Canada

Les Abbatoirs, Toulouse, France

Los Angeles County Museum of Art, Los Angeles, CA, USA

Mona – Museum of Old and New Art, Hobart, TAS, Australia

Monash University Museum of Art, Melbourne, VIC, Australia

Museum of Contemporary Art Chicago, Chicago, IL, USA

Museum of Contemporary Art, Sydney, NSW, Australia

The Museum of Modern Art, New York, NY, USA

National Gallery of Australia, Canberra, ACT, Australia

National Gallery of Canada, Ottawa, Canada

National Gallery of Victoria, Melbourne, VIC, Australia

RISD Museum, Rhode Island School of Design, Providence, RI, USA

Saatchi Gallery, London

Solomon R. Guggenheim Museum, New York, NY, USA

TarraWarra Museum of Art, Healesville, VIC, Australia

University of Ballarat Art Collection, Ballarat, VIC, Australia

Whitney Museum of American Art, New York, NY, USA

Zabludowicz Collection, London
