= Prevention of dementia =

Possible prevention methods of dementia

Prevalence of dementias

The prevention of dementia involves reducing the number of risk factors for the development of dementia, and is a global health priority needing a global response. Initiatives include the establishment of the International Research Network on Dementia Prevention (IRNDP) which aims to link researchers in this field globally, and the establishment of the Global Dementia Observatory a web-based data knowledge and exchange platform, which will collate and disseminate key dementia data from members states. Although there is no cure for dementia, it is well established that modifiable risk factors influence both the likelihood of developing dementia and the age at which it is developed.

Potentially modifiable risk factors for vascular dementia include high blood pressure, diabetes, obesity, smoking, physical inactivity, and depression. A study concluded that more than a third of dementia cases are theoretically preventable. Among older adults both an unfavorable lifestyle and high genetic risk are independently associated with higher dementia risk. A favorable lifestyle is associated with a lower dementia risk, regardless of genetic risk. In 2020, a study identified 12 modifiable lifestyle factors, and the early treatment of acquired hearing loss was estimated as the most significant of these factors, potentially preventing up to 9% of dementia cases. A later study added two more risk factors of vision loss, and high cholesterol. Other studies show that certain vaccines, such as the shingles vaccine, could have a significant protective effect against the risk of dementia.

== Lifestyle ==
=== Mental activity ===
"Use it or lose it" might be applied to the brain when it comes to dementia. Intellectual activities help keep the mind in shape in later years. Activities such as reading, learning a new language, playing cards and board games and playing a musical instrument can postpone the onset and slow the progression of both Alzheimer's and vascular dementia. The risk decrease is proportional to frequency of activity, with slower cognitive decline being associated with both late-life and early-life increased cognitive activity.

Apart from spare time activities, a mentally demanding job may prevent dementia, especially during the thirties, forties and fifties.

Mental activity may help to prevent dementia by building up cognitive reserve: additional connections between neurons are created which are more resistant to the deterioration seen in dementia.

=== Physical activity ===
Since vascular dementia is the second most common form of dementia (after Alzheimer's disease), reducing the risk of cerebrovascular disease also reduces the risk of dementia. Thus, physical exercise, having good blood cholesterol, healthy body weight and blood pressure lowers the risk of developing dementia. An active lifestyle can almost halve the risk compared to a sedentary one.

Results of one meta-analysis, which investigated the relationship between physical activity and risk of cognitive decline in people without dementia, showed exercise had a significant and consistent protective effect against cognitive decline, with high levels of physical activity being most protective. Another meta-analysis showed that not only did aerobic exercise reduce the risk of dementia but it may also slow cognitive decline in those with dementia.

The effect of physical activity is not limited to vascular effects. Physical activity can give rise to new neurons in the brain, as well as releasing a substance that can protect them. The protein known as brain-derived neurotrophic factor (BDNF) is known to be important in the development, survival and plasticity of neurons. Regular exercise can boost BDNF levels by 2–3 times.

=== Alcohol ===
The effect of alcohol on the risk of dementia was thought to be a J curve: high alcohol consumption increases the risk of dementia while low, non-zero amounts of alcohol consumption was thought to be protective. However, newer findings challenge the notion that low levels of drinking are preventive, and instead show that any amount of alcohol consumption increases the risk of dementia. Additionally, low alcohol consumption may not protect against vascular dementia and overall cognitive decline. Moderate alcohol consumption can possibly reduce the risk of vascular disease and dementia because it can increase blood levels of HDL cholesterol and weakens blood-clotting agents such as fibrinogen, which offers some protection against heart attacks and small subclinical strokes that together can ultimately damage the brain.

=== Diet ===
The effects of omega-3 fatty acid in the prevention of dementia is uncertain. Vegetables and nuts may be of benefit, because of their high content of polyunsaturated fats. A study has shown that heavy consumption of processed red meats, can be associated with the development of dementia.

Niacin (vitamin B_{3}) is also believed to prevent dementia as research shows those who have the highest levels of niacin in their blood, are believed to have the lowest risk of developing dementia or having cognitive decline. Niacin is involved with DNA synthesis and repair and also neural cell signaling, it improves circulation and reduces cholesterol levels.

There is evidence for an association between cognitive decline, homocysteine (Hcy) status, and vitamin B status relating especially to B12 and also to vitamins B6 and B9. In particular, deficiency of vitamin B12 and/or of folate can cause an increase in Hcy plasma levels, which in turn leads to toxic effects on the vascular and nervous systems.

Vitamin D deficiency correlates with cognitive impairment and dementia; however, the value of vitamin D substitution in cognitive impairment remains doubtful.

Thiamine (vitamin B1) deficiency is associated with Alzheimer's disease. The deficiency results in a cholinergic deficit, an established feature of Alzheimer's.

Obesity increases the risk of any dementia and Alzheimer's disease in particular.

=== Sleep pattern ===
More than nine hours of sleep per day (including daytime napping) may be associated with an increased risk of dementia. Lack of sleep may also increase risk of Alzheimer's dementia by increasing beta-amyloid deposition.

=== Personality and mental health ===
Some personality traits such as being neurotic increases the risk of developing Alzheimer's, a type of dementia. Neuroticism is associated with increased brain atrophy and cognitive impairment in life, while conscientiousness has a protective effect by preventing brain atrophy. A meta-analysis found that the openness and agreeableness traits have also some protective effects.

Based on the English Longitudinal Study of Ageing (ELSA), research found that loneliness increased the risk of dementia by one-third. Not having a partner (being single, divorced, or widowed) doubled the risk of dementia. However, having two or three closer relationships reduced the risk by three-fifths.

=== Depression ===
Depressive symptoms can be a part of the clinical presentation of dementia, leading to debate as to whether depression is a cause or a symptom of dementia. The evidence remains unclear. However, Livingston et al. (2014) report that it is "biologically plausible" that depression increases the risk of dementia. There is some evidence that late-life depression increases the risk of dementia however suggesting treating depression in mid-life might delay or prevent dementia.

== Medication ==
=== Hypertension ===
Some studies say Alzheimer's and other dementias may be caused by high blood pressure, since it can cause blood vessel damage through constriction. The etiology of vascular dementia includes hypertension, and thus, lowering blood pressure with antihypertensives may have a positive effect in the prevention of dementia, just as physical activity.

However, one study failed to demonstrate a link between high blood pressure and developing dementia. The study, published in the Lancet Neurology journal of July 2008, found that blood pressure lowering medication did not reduce the incidence of dementia to a statistically significant degree. A prospective meta-analysis of the data from this study with other studies suggested that further research might be warranted.

While the results of studies are somewhat inconsistent, it has been recommended that hypertension in mid-life (45–65 years) and older age (65+ years) should be actively treated to reduce the risk of dementia.

=== Anti-diabetic drugs ===
Diabetes is a risk factor for dementia, and thus the risk of dementia is lowered when treating with anti-diabetic drugs.

Rosiglitazone (Avandia), an antidiabetic drug, improves memory and thinking ability for people with mild Alzheimer's disease. The mechanism of this effect may be the ability of the drug to reduce insulin resistance. Thus, less insulin needs to be released to achieve its metabolic effects. Insulin in the bloodstream is a trigger of amyloid beta production, so decreased insulin levels decrease the level of amyloid beta. This leads to the formation of fewer amyloid plaques seen in Alzheimer's disease.

=== Steroid hormones ===
Estrogen may play a role in the prevention of dementia. Observational positron emission tomography studies indicate that estrogen helps to preserve function in brain areas affected by dementia, but research into estrogen hormone replacement therapy (HRT) and dementia is conflicting. Some studies suggest that HRT may reduce the risk of dementia, while others suggest an increased dementia risk with HRT. This uncertainty is due in part to a variety of factors such as dose, route of administration (transdermal or oral), length of treatment, age, and time from menopause. Additionally, while studies may show a connection between dementia and HRT, they do not show if HRT causes dementia.

=== NSAIDs ===
Non-steroidal anti-inflammatory drugs (NSAIDs) can decrease the risk of developing Alzheimer's and Parkinson's diseases. The length of time needed to prevent dementia varies, but in most studies it is usually between 2 and 10 years. Research has also shown that it must be used in clinically relevant dosages and that so called "baby aspirin" doses are ineffective at treating dementia.

Alzheimer's disease causes inflammation in the neurons by its deposits of amyloid beta peptides and neurofibrillary tangles. These deposits irritate the body by causing a release of e.g. cytokines and acute phase proteins, leading to inflammation. When these substances accumulate over years they contribute to the effects of Alzheimer's. NSAIDs inhibit the formation of such inflammatory substances, and prevent the deteriorating effects.

In 2020 a systematic review conducted by Cochrane of four randomized controlled trials with 23,187 participants concluded that the use of low-dose aspirin and NSAIDS of any type for the prevention of dementia was not supported and that there could be harm.

=== Vaccine ===
There is as yet no vaccine against dementia. It has been theorized that a vaccine could activate the body's own immune system to combat the beta amyloid plaques in Alzheimer's disease. One problem to overcome is overreaction from the immune system, leading to encephalitis.

=== Anticholinergic medication ===
Anticholinergic medications are often prescribed to treat health conditions commonly experienced by older people including overactive bladder and many commonly used medications have anticholinergic activity. There has been some observational research that has suggested a linkage between anticholinergic medication use and cognitive decline in older adults. Suggestions to reduce the 'anticholinergic burden', try to modify a person's medications to reduce the use of medications that have anticholinergic activity in a safe way, are often made in dementia guidelines with the goal of improving cognition and/or reducing further decline. The evidence supporting this approach to preventing dementia is weak, however, if safe to do so, and in light of some weaker observational evidence suggesting that these medications may be related to adverse effects or poorer outcomes, it is clinically suggested to prescribe these medications with caution and if safe to do so reduce their use.

== See also ==
- Prevention of chronic traumatic encephalopathy
- Prevention of concussions
- Prevention of traumatic brain injury
- Preventive medicine
