= James Gill =

James Gill may refer to:

- Jim Gill (1865–1923), American baseball player
- Jimmy Gill (footballer, born 1882) (1882-1948), English footballer, see List of Bury F.C. players (1–24 appearances)
- Jimmy Gill (1894–1964), English footballer of the 1910s, and 1920s
- James E. Gill (1901–1980), scientist, teacher, explorer and mine developer
- James Gill (footballer, born 1903), English footballer of the 1930s
- James Gill (Irish cricketer) (1911–2000), Irish cricketer
- James Gill (New Zealand cricketer) (1928–2019), New Zealand cricketer
- James Gill (artist) (born 1934), American pop-artist
- James Gill (columnist) (born c. 1942), columnist for The Advocate (Louisiana)
- James Gill (musician), former bassist for American hardcore band Senses Fail
- James Elgin Gill (born 1987), world's most premature baby

== See also ==
- John Gill (footballer, born 1903) (1903-?), English footballer, also known as Jimmy Gill
