= Anthony Gill =

Anthony Gill may refer to:

- Anthony Gill (basketball) (born 1992), American basketball player
- Anthony Gill (political scientist) (born 1965), American political scientist
- Anthony Gill (pathologist) (born 1972), Australian pathologist and medical researcher
- A. A. Gill (Adrian Anthony Gill, 1954–2016), British writer and critic
- Tony Gill (born 1968), English footballer
