= Charles Gill =

Charles Gill may refer to:

- Charles-Ignace Gill (1844–1901), Canadian Member of Parliament
- Charles Gill (artist) (1871–1918), Canadian painter and poet
- Charles O. Gill (1868–1959), American college football coach
- Charlie Gill (1923–1986), Australian rugby league footballer
- Charles Lovett Gill (1880–1960), Scottish architect
- Charles R. Gill (1830–1883), politician in the state of Wisconsin
- Charles Hope Gill (1861–1946), bishop of Travancore and Cochin
