= Gill Rosenberg =

- גיל רוזנברג
- Born: Gillian Chelsea Clarissa Rosenberg; 1983 (age 42–43); White Rock, British Columbia, Canada
- Other name: Gila Rosenberg
- Education: British Columbia Institute of Technology
- Military career
- Allegiance: Israel (2006–08) Rojava (2014–15)
- Branch: IDF YPJ
- Service years: 2006–08; 2014–15
- Rank: NCO (Israel)
- Units: Search, Rescue and Civil Defense School (IDF); YPJ (Rojava)
- Known for: First female foreigner to join the Women's Protection Units in Syria
- Conflicts: Syrian Civil War; Rojava campaign
- Other work: Civil aviation pilot

Gill or Gila (Gillian Chelsea Clarissa) Rosenberg (Hebrew: גיל רוזנברג; born 1983) is an Israeli woman who became internationally known when she became the first female foreigner to join the Women's Protection Units fighting the Islamic State of Iraq and the Levant. Islamists claimed that Rosenberg had become an ISIL hostage, leading to significant additional press coverage. These reports proved false.

== Early life ==
Gill Rosenberg was born in Canada and is reported to be from White Rock, British Columbia. She attended a Jewish high school in Vancouver and the British Columbia Institute of Technology (BCIT). She had worked as a pilot on Boeing passenger aircraft.

She unsuccessfully ran for city councillor in the 2002 municipal election in Surrey, British Columbia receiving 2,634 votes.

Rosenberg moved to Israel and also acquired Israeli citizenship under the Law of Return, living in Tel Aviv. In Israel, Rosenberg joined the Israel Defense Forces (IDF) from 2006 to 2008 as a volunteer, where she served as a SAR NCO and instructor at the Home Front Command's Search, Rescue and Civil Defense School.

== Criminal conviction ==
In 2009, Rosenberg was arrested, extradited to the United States, and pleaded guilty to participating in a telemarketing lottery fraud. As part of a plea bargain, she was sentenced to four years in prison in a Manhattan federal court, but later her sentence was reduced before she was deported to Israel.

== Joining the Kurds ==
Rosenberg gained international press coverage as the first foreign woman to join Kurds battling the Islamic State of Iraq and the Levant in Syria or Iraq. According to an interview with Kol Yisrael (Israel Radio) quoted by The Jerusalem Post she decided to join the Women's Protection Units, the female counterpart of the People's Protection Units (YPG) fighters, for humanitarian and ideological reasons and "because they are our brothers" who are fighting evil. Wladimir van Wilgenburg, an analyst for the Jamestown Foundation, said, "Rosenberg is quite popular among the Kurds, especially those who sympathize with Israel’s national struggle, and the fact that the Israelis/Jews managed to create their state, something which a lot of Kurdish nationalists aspire to."

The Jerusalem Post stated that upon return to Israel, she would be arrested and prosecuted, as was the case with several Israeli Arabs who joined ISIL and subsequently returned to Israel. The paper pointed out that Rosenberg also breached Israeli law by flying to Iraq, an enemy country, which Israeli citizens are forbidden to enter; the Israeli government had also cracked down on those going to fight against Syrian President Bashar al-Assad.

In Canada, Minister of Public Safety Steven Blaney stated that while the government "would not oppose a citizen who is willing to engage in a battle for liberty and helping the victims of barbaric crimes," he believed that "the best way to fight terrorism is to support our national law enforcement or national security agencies and eventually get involved with them."

In late November 2014, militants on social media started claiming that Rosenberg had been captured, along with several other female fighters, by ISIL, perhaps during the Siege of Kobanî. This was denied by Kurdish officials who said she was nowhere near Kobanî. On December 1, Rosenberg updated her Facebook page, saying that she was safe. If captured, she would have been the second Israeli dual citizen, after American-Israeli journalist Steven Sotloff, and the first Canadian, to be held hostage by ISIL. There was also speculation that, if she had been captured, Canada might have mounted a rescue operation to retrieve her.

== Return to Israel ==
Gill Rosenberg returned to Israel on 12 July 2015 after 6 months in Syria and Iraq.
