= Bob Gill (daredevil) =

American motorcycle racer and stunt performer

Bob Gill is the world-record holding motorcycle stuntman. He was one of the few jumpers to eschew the use of a landing ramp. His career was cut short in 1974 when he landed short on a world-record attempt to jump the 200-foot (61 m) wide Appalachia Lake in Bruceton Mills, West Virginia.

== Racer to jumper ==
Gill began as a motorcycle racer in 1962. Unsatisfied with the money he was making as a racer, he switched to jumping full-time in 1970. After several long jumps, including one jump 152 feet over the Cajun Canyon in Louisiana, he jumped over a set of Ryder trucks on May 10, 1973. The jump was filmed for a television commercial that was aired during Super Bowl VIII .

== World record ==
On July 17, 1973, Gill set a world record jump of 171 feet (52 m) when he jumped over 22 cars with no landing ramp at Seattle International Raceway in Kent, WA.

== Appalachia Lake ==
On August 18, 1974, Gill was scheduled to attempt a world record jump over the 200-foot (61 m)-wide Appalachia Lake in Bruceton Mills, West Virginia. Heavy rains in the area forced the postponement of the jump to August 25.

The jump was performed without the aid of a landing ramp. Gill landed three feet short on the embankment of the far side of the lake. Thrown from the bike, he suffered severe spinal cord injuries that left him permanently paralyzed.

== Other Info ==
Gill appeared on the TV show To Tell the Truth in the 1970s.

He founded "Bob Gill Awareness Foundation" and resides in Tampa Bay, Florida.

== Sources ==
- Morgantown, West Virginia Dominion-Post, August 19, 1974
