= Paul Gill =

English cricketer (born 1963)

Paul Gill (born 31 May 1963 in Greenfield, West Riding of Yorkshire) is an English former cricketer active from 1986 to 1987 who played for Leicestershire. He appeared in eight first-class matches as a righthanded batsman who kept wicket. He scored 68 runs with a highest score of 17 and completed 24 catches.
