= Richard Gill =

Richard Gill may refer to:

- Richard Gill (plant collector) (c. 1901–1958), known for work on traditional curare preparation methods
- Richard T. Gill (1927–2010), opera singer and Harvard economics professor
- Richard Gill (conductor) (1941–2018), Australian conductor
- Richard D. Gill (born 1951), Anglo-Dutch mathematician / mathematical statistician
- Richard J. Gill (1886–1959), lumberman and political figure in New Brunswick
- Richard Gill, a character from the film Hackers
