= Peter Gill =

Peter Gill may refer to:

- Peter Gill (playwright) (1939–2026), British playwright and actor
- Peter Gill (VC) (1831–1868), Irish Victoria Cross recipient
- Peter Gill (chemist) (born 1962), New Zealand computational chemist
- Peter Gill (politician) (died 2021), Pakistani politician

== Musicians ==
- Pete Gill (born 1951), former drummer of the bands Saxon and Motörhead
- Peter Gill (born 1964), drummer of the band Frankie Goes to Hollywood
- Peter Gill, member of the electronic music group Love Decade
- Peter Gill, founder of the indie rock band 2nd Grade

== Sportsmen ==
- Peter Gill (golfer) (1930–2020), English golfer
- Peter Gill (cricketer) (born 1947), English cricketer
- Peter Gill (rugby league) (born 1964), Australian rugby league footballer
