= Gill Berkeley =

Scottish academic administrator

Gillian Berkeley FRSC FRSE is a Scottish academic administrator who specialises in curriculum management. A native of Dundee, she has served as assistant director of curriculum and quality at Moray College, chair for education in Scotland at the Royal Society of Chemistry, and head of curriculum at Inverness College.

== Biography ==
Gillian Berkeley, a native of Dundee, was born in 1962 or 1963. Her career in education began sometime in the mid-1980s, and she initially taught science at a secondary school.

In 1991, she began working at Moray College, where she worked as their assistant director of curriculum and quality. In March 2015, she was hired by Inverness College to be their head of curriculum. She has served as chair for education in Scotland at the Royal Society of Chemistry.

She was a co-founder of the Moray Science Festival and promoted the use of networked science degrees within the Highlands and Islands. She also worked on the implementation of chemistry within courses and on the implementation and design of academic qualifications.

In 2019, she was awarded the Royal Society of Chemistry Award for Exceptional Service "for outstanding service to the Royal Society of Chemistry and the chemical education community in Scotland". In 2023, she was elected a Fellow of the Royal Society of Edinburgh. She is also a Fellow of the Royal Society of Chemistry.
