= Gil Cohen =

Gil Cohen may refer to:

- Gil Cohen (artist) (born 1931), American artist
- Gil Cohen (footballer) (born 2000), Israeli footballer
- Gil Cohen (sailor) (born 1992), Israeli Olympic sports sailor

== See also ==
- Gili Cohen (born 1991), Israeli Olympic judoka
