= R. R. Rockingham Gill =

South African philosopher

Richard Rowan Rockingham Gill (born 1944) is a lecturer of philosophy, in particular logic, and is an author.

Gill received a MA from the University of St Andrews and has published variously in the Journal of Symbolic Logic, Archiv für mathematische Logik und Grundlagenforschung (Archive for Mathematical Logic and Basic Research) and other journals.

He lectured at the University of Wales, Lampeter and is also the former head of the Department of Philosophy.

== Publications ==
=== Articles ===
- The Craig-Lyndon Interpolation Theorem in 3-Valued Logic, The Journal of Symbolic Logic, Vol. 35, No. 2 (Jun. 1970), pp. 230–238
- Soviet Oil in the 1980s: Shortage or Surplus?, The RUSI Journal, Vol. 121, No. 2 (Jun. 1976), pp. 73–77
- On Wandschneider's Way Out, Ratio, Vol. 19, No. 1 (1977), pp. 85–87
- Frege on Infinite Axiom-Systems, Analysis, Vol. 47, No. 3 (Jun. 1987), pp. 173–175
- The Logic of Common Nouns, Philosophical Books, Vol. 23, No. 4 (Feb. 2009), pp 243–244

=== Book reviews ===
- Modern Logic—a survey. Historical, Philosophical, and Mathematical Aspects of Modern Logic and its Applications. Edited by Evandro Agazzi, Mind, New Series, Vol. 92, No. 366 (Apr. 1983), pp. 286–288

=== Books ===
- Deducibility and Decidability, Routledge: 1990 (ISBN 0-415-00033-5)

== Reviews ==
- Hart, W.D., Deducibility and Decidability. By R. R. Rockingham Gill., The Philosophical Quarterly, Vol. 41, No. 163 (Apr. 1991), pp. 242–243
- Visser, Albert, Deducibility and Decidability. By R. R. Rockingham Gill., The Journal of Symbolic Logic, Vol. 58, No. 3 (Sep. 1993), pp. 1080–1082
