= DeLancey W. Gill =

American painter and photographer (1859–1940)

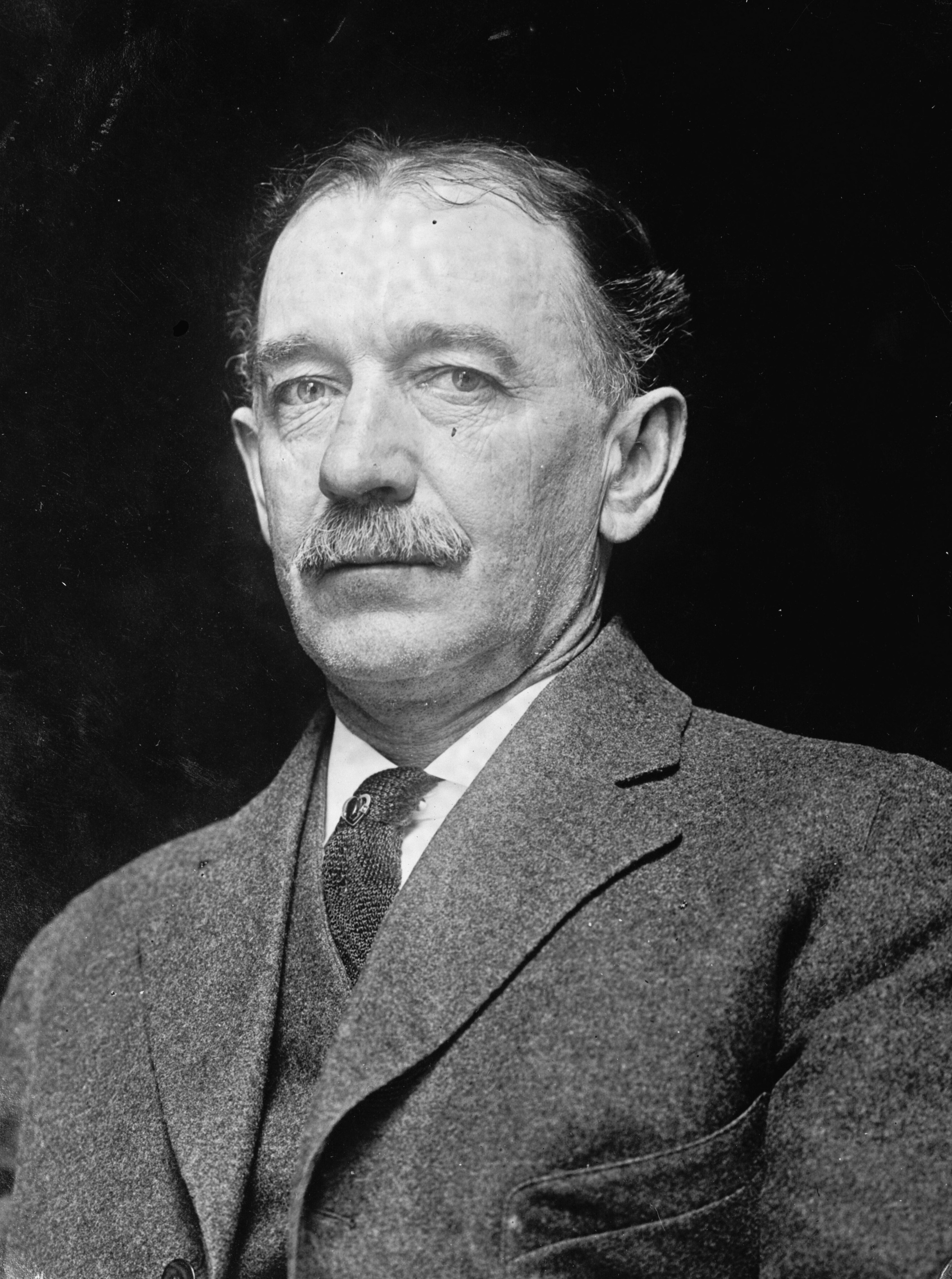
- Gill, c. 1910s
- Born: DeLancey Walker Gill; July 1, 1859; Camden, South Carolina, U.S.
- Died: August 31, 1940 (aged 81); Alexandria, Virginia, U.S.
- Employers: United States Geological Survey; Smithsonian Institution
- Spouses: Rose DeLima Draper (m. 1881; died 1893) Mary Irvin Wright (m. 1895; div. 1903) Katharine Schley Hemmick (m. 1905)
- Children: 8, including Minna P.

DeLancey Walker Gill (July 1, 1859 – August 31, 1940) was an American drafter, landscape painter, and photographer. Gill first became noted for his landscape illustrations and watercolors, featuring subjects such as Native American pueblos in addition to his main focus on Washington, D.C. Characterized as detailed and meticulous in his landscapes, Gill captured views of working-class and rural areas of Washington not commonly depicted in art of the period. Despite his other work, he continued to paint throughout his life, and taught art classes at the Corcoran School.

Gill was employed as an illustrator and draftsman for the United States Treasury, followed by similar work for the United States Geological Survey. He was director of the Division of Illustration at the Smithsonian Institution's Bureau of American Ethnology (BAE) from 1889 to 1932. Following the resignation of two of the Smithsonian's photographers in 1898, Gill, while not trained in photography, took over these duties at the BAE. In this role, he produced thousands of photographs of Native American delegations for the Bureau, including notable figures such as Geronimo and Chief Joseph. Gill's photographic work was showcased in Smithsonian publications, the Panama–Pacific Exposition and on a 1923 postage stamp. His portraiture has been praised for its pictorialist qualities and strength of design. He frequently gave clothing (at times outdated or misattributed) to Native American delegates. While Gill's costuming of delegates was considered salvage ethnography in the period, it has been criticized in modern studies for reinforcing contemporary stereotypes and misrepresenting his subjects and their cultures.

== Biography ==
=== Early life ===
Gill was born in Camden, South Carolina, on July 1, 1859. His father, William Harrison Gill, a merchant, was killed in action serving in the Confederate Army when DeLancey was five. Nine years later, his mother and stepfather moved to Fort Laramie in the Wyoming Territory. Gill chose instead to move in with an aunt in Washington, D.C. He briefly worked as a typesetter before finding employment as a draftsman for the Office of the Supervising Architect for the U.S. Treasury, specializing in ornamental ironwork and tiles.

=== Painting and illustration ===
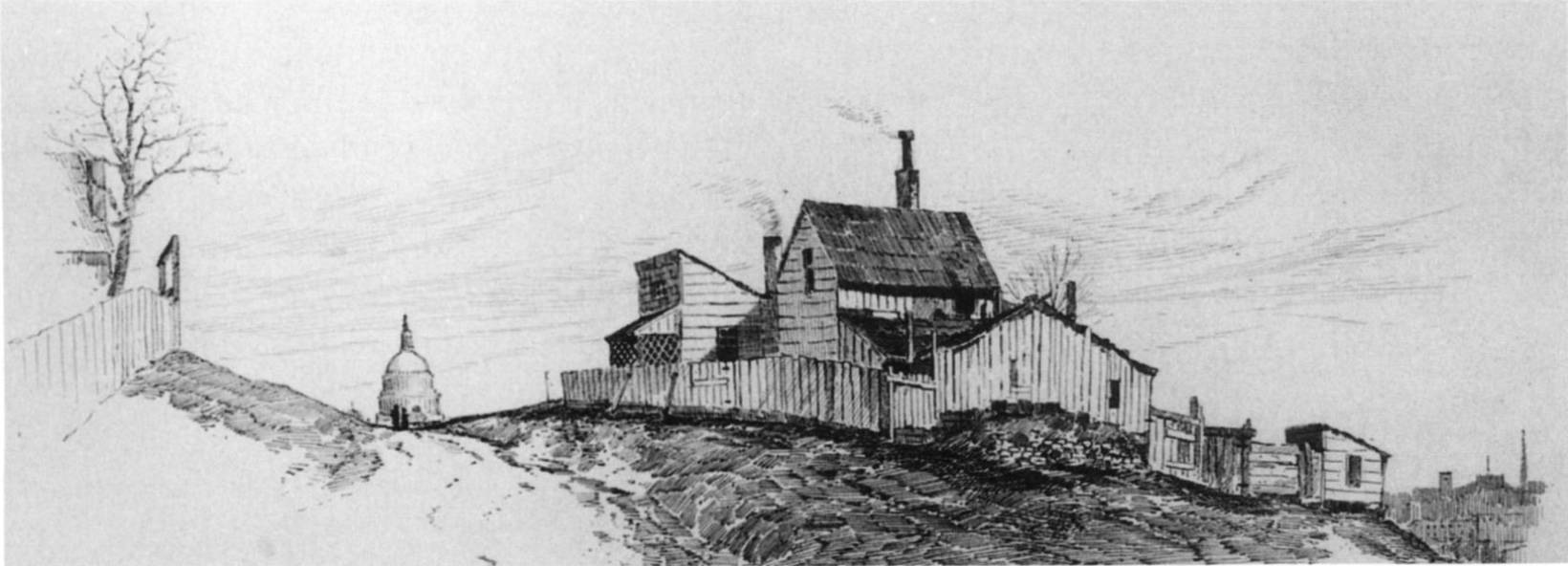
Ink sketch of a Washington, D.C., homestead by Gill, c. 1880

While employed as a draftsman, Gill began a series of ink sketches and watercolor paintings, primarily of landscapes in Washington, D.C. He focused on capturing the villages of the district's rural periphery. Gill's sketches are a relatively rare depiction of poorer neighborhoods of Washington during the 1880s, including Black and immigrant communities. A detailed illustration of a shanty house, his only drawing showing an indoor environment, serves as an isolated example of the interiors of working-class housing in the city. Gill's watercolors brought acclaim, to the point that he received a greater income from art sales than his work with the Treasury. In 1881, his paintings were shown at an exhibition in New York City.

Mouth of James Creek, by Gill c. 1880s, showing the Capitol as seen from a rural portion of Washington

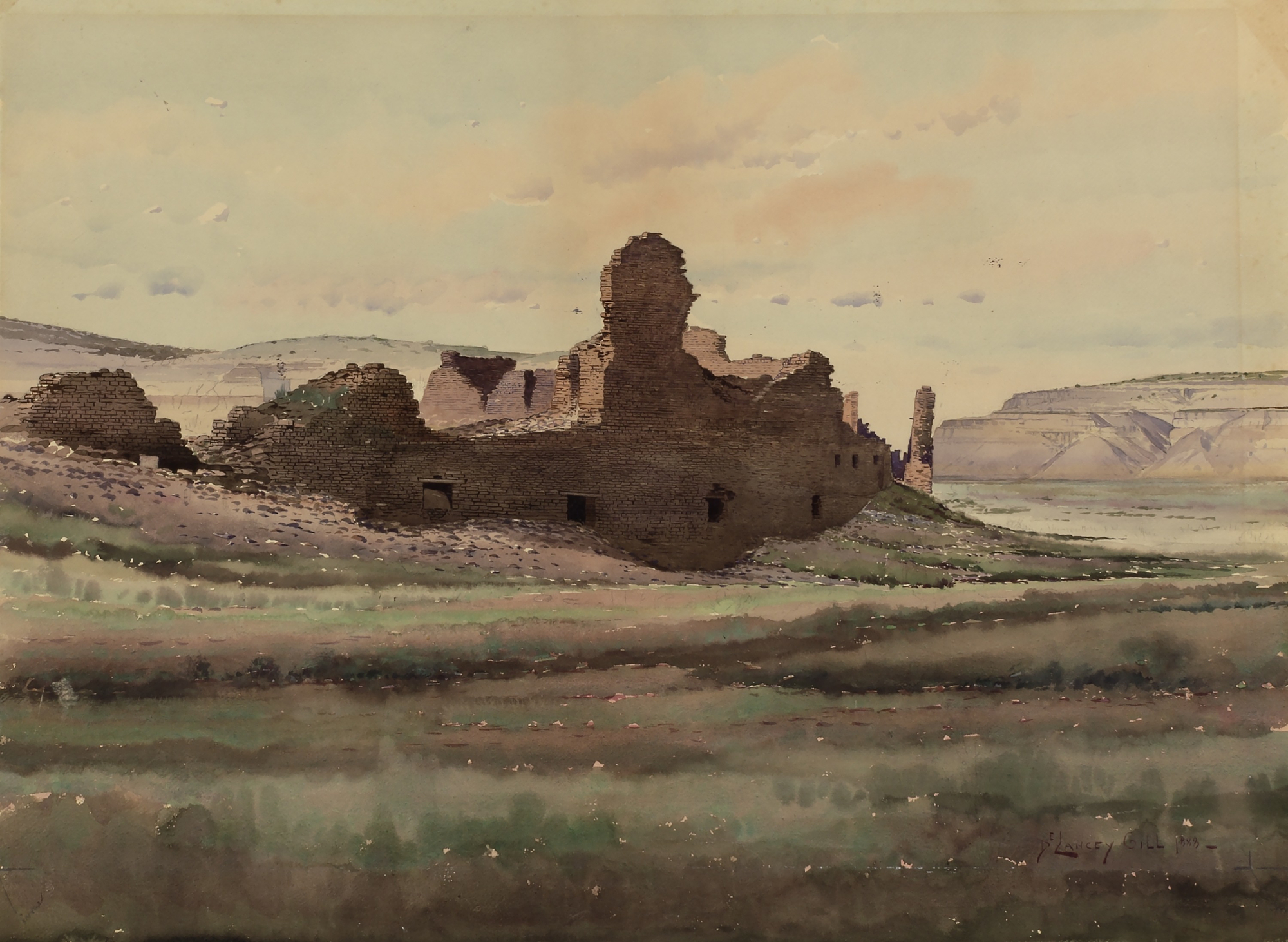
Pueblo Bonito Ruin, Chaco Canyon, New Mexico, by Gill, 1888

United States Geological Survey (USGS) chief of illustration William Henry Holmes hired Gill as a paleontological draftsman in 1884. Holmes, a fellow watercolor painter, came to greatly respect Gill's artistic work, later claiming that "as an illustrator in pen, pencil, and water-colour, and as a photographer, he had few equals." Gill was rapidly promoted through the USGS, due in part to Holmes's admiration. In 1889, he succeeded Holmes as chief of illustration when the latter joined the Bureau of American Ethnology (BAE) to direct archaeological operations. As chief of illustration, Gill managed the publication of illustrations and photography, examining all copies of printed illustrations. As John Wesley Powell was the director of both the USGS and the BAE, employees of both agencies were frequently assigned duties in the other. As such, Gill was additionally tasked with supervising the BAE's illustrations.

During his initial time with the Bureau in the late 1880s, Gill produced paintings of southwestern pueblos, departing from his prior focus on Washington. These included the Hopi pueblo of Oraibi, the ruins of Pueblo Bonito, and Zuni Pueblo. His painting of Oraibi was based on an earlier photograph by Smithsonian photographer John K. Hillers, but no photographic source is known for the other pueblos within the series. Gill accounted for climatic differences in his landscapes, making use of thin washes for his depictions of southwestern locations.

Although Gill largely stepped away from painting during a period of increased work within the BAE, he continued to paint throughout his life. In 1890, he showcased several of his paintings at an American Watercolor Society exhibition in New York. He returned to art exhibition in 1922, showcasing his paintings at the Morrey Gallery in Washington. He also pursued private illustration work, including the label for a local whiskey brand.

==== Reception ====
Gill's watercolor work was favorably received by contemporary art critics, with a reviewer for the Brooklyn Daily Eagle describing his landscapes as "airy, clean, silvery" and distinct from other watercolorists. In 1983, art historians Andrew Cosentino and Henry Glassie wrote favorably of the extreme clarity and attention to detail shown in Gill's paintings. Cultural historian Lisa Goff praised his illustrations, writing in 2016 that his sketches of Washington, D.C. were "not nostalgic or sentimental, but [...] studies of a vanishing landscape", made without demeaning the working-class shanties. Like his later work, these drawings have been described by Goff as meticulous and documentative, taking "little if any artistic license".

=== Photography ===
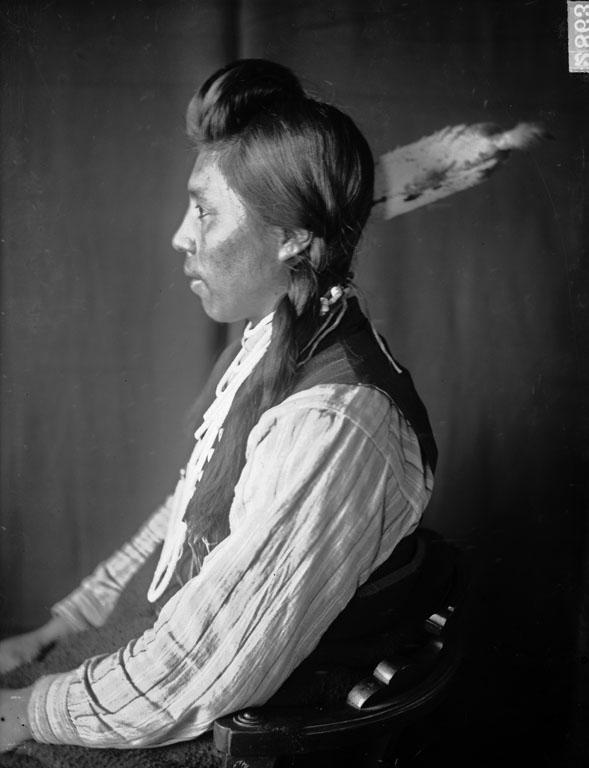
Profile of a Yakama man by Gill, 1906. BAE portraits were posed to allow for facial and cranial measurements of subjects.

In 1889, Gill discovered ancient stone tools while sketching at Rock Creek Park, later estimated as dating to around 2000 BC. He later took photographs of the artifacts in situ for an archaeological exploration organized by Holmes, his first known photographic work.

In 1894, Powell resigned from the USGS to focus on administration of the BAE. Four years later, Gill also resigned in order to continue work on Bureau publications. Despite having no prior training in photography, Gill was appointed as the Bureau's photographer following the resignation of the BAE's two previous photographers. In this position, Gill's work consisted of portrait photography of Native American subjects, primarily delegates to the capital, at a rate of hundreds of individuals per year. The total number of his portraits is unknown, but has been estimated to be between 2,000 and 3,000; an Evening Times account upon his retirement put the figure at around 7,000. He also extensively classified and cataloged the resulting photographic negatives along ethnolinguistic lines, at one point re-cataloging the entire BAE archive of Native portraits.

Delegations of Native American peoples to Washington, D.C., were common throughout the 19th century, often to negotiate treaties or dissuade frontier conflicts. Government photography of these delegations had begun in the 1860s and 1870s. The frequency of delegations increased over the 1890s, with many arriving during winter congressional sessions. They were generally not paid to sit for photographs, although Apache chief Geronimo, who had fixed prices for portrait sittings, successfully demanded payment from Gill before shooting.

Joseph Henry, the first secretary of the Smithsonian Institution, ordered that Native delegations should be photographed without headdresses so that the "configuration of the head" could be recorded. William Henry Holmes, succeeding Powell as Chief of the BAE in 1902, also emphasized the "anthropometric elements" of the photographs, placing items with known sizes around subjects in order to allow for facial and cranial measurements to be taken. However, as ethnographic and historical purposes were increasingly pursued, subjects were often depicted with headdresses, wearing Native dress and holding tools or artifacts associated with their tribe. Occasionally, subjects were given clothing that was anachronistic or from other tribes. Gill photographed all studio subjects in a "mug-shot" approach, with head-and-shoulders profile and front-facing shots. However, full body shots were also taken, usually of subjects in traditional clothing.

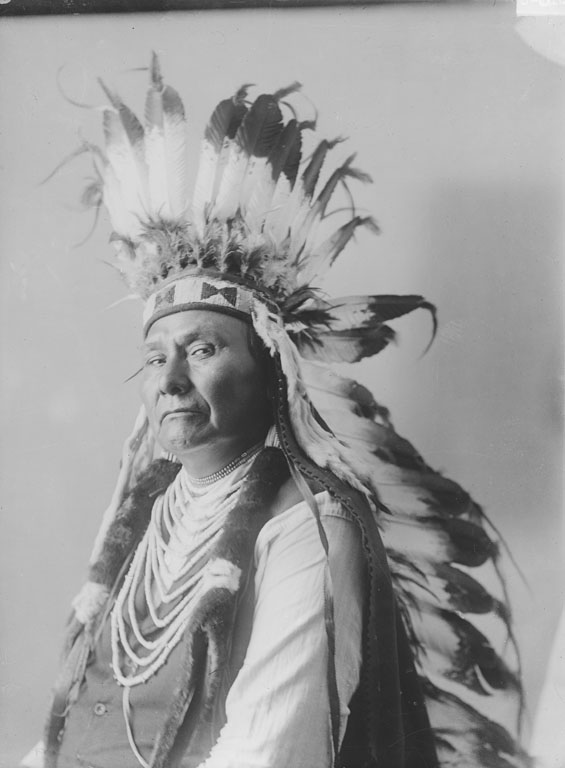
Portrait of Chief Joseph by Gill, 1900

Prior to 1904, Gill photographed delegations at the Downtown offices of the BAE. However, the walk downtown was disliked by many delegates, who preferred to stay in the vicinity of the Smithsonian. The studio was later moved to the upper floor of the Smithsonian's National Museum Building (now the Arts and Industries Building).

Gill occasionally took field photographs of Native Americans in addition to his studio portraiture. In 1899, he photographed residents of the Pamunkey Reservation. The following year, he partnered with William John McGee on an expedition to Arizona and New Mexico, photographing members of the Akimel O'odham, Cocopah, Seri, and Tohono Oʼodham. During this expedition, he named Klotho's Temple, one of the Muggins Mountains of southwestern Arizona.

Gill also accompanied Holmes to document Native American archaeological sites, working both as a photographer and field assistant. In 1901, they investigated sites in Missouri and the Indian Territory, recording the bones of humans and extinct mammals. He worked with Holmes to photograph archaeological sites in Maryland: his 1907 work at a site on Popes Creek was later described by biographer J .R. Glenn as "some of his best field photographs." In 1918, they investigated remains discovered at the Aberdeen Proving Ground.

In addition to portraits, Gill prepared and photographed in Smithsonian anthropological publications, including many in the collections of other institutions. In 1913, he photographed Ho-Chunk medicine bundles at University Museum, writing that he attempted to "eliminate all but the genuine old stuff".

Many notable Native American figures were photographed by Gill, including the delegation sent to Washington during the second inauguration of Theodore Roosevelt. He described the Nez Perce Chief Joseph, photographed on several occasions, as having "the dignity of a chief justice" and "an air of gentleness and quiet reserve." In one 1903 sitting, Gill asked Joseph for a totem mark (Note: "Totem marks" were described in contemporary sources as protective symbols for a clan, tribe, or individual, often serving the purpose of a signature in treaties and official documentation.) as a substitute for his signature. Instead, Joseph signed his name in full for Gill, alongside the year 1900. He ignored protests from Gill regarding the incorrect date, claiming it was exactly how he was taught to sign by a friend. Gill's photography prominently featured in Smithsonian publications during his career, such as the Handbook of American Indians North of Mexico, as well as posthumously in the 1978 Handbook of North American Indians. Over the course of the 1910s, displays of his prints were shown at the Panama–Pacific International Exposition, the Panama–California Exposition, as well as various public libraries. His 1905 portrait of Hollow Horn Bear was used on a fourteen-cent postage stamp in 1923.

From 1903 to 1905, Gill delegated some of his portrait work to United States National Museum photographer Thomas Smillie. Due to Gill's worsening eyesight, many of his photography duties with the Smithsonian were transferred to A. J. Olmsted in 1926, although he continued to be involved with portrait photography in a limited capacity. He continued work as illustration editor for various bureaus within the Smithsonian in addition to the BAE, including the United States National Museum. In October 1931, he photographed Crazy Bull, grandson of Sitting Bull. This would be one of his last photographs taken for the Bureau.

The Economy Act of 1932 prompted Gill to retire from the Smithsonian and declare his intention to focus on art and painting. Following his retirement, the BAE was left without a head photographer, and photographs of visiting Native delegations largely shifted to informal sittings.

==== Reception ====
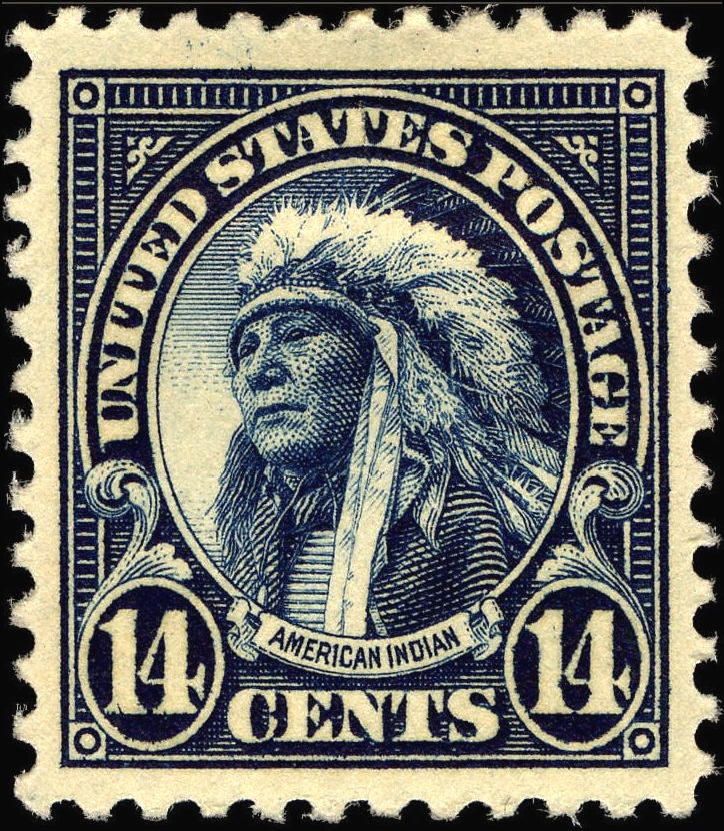
American Indian fourteen-cent stamp, 1923, based on a portrait of Hollow Horn Bear taken by Gill

Gill's early portraits, especially full-body and group photographs, were characterized by Glenn as inartistic, featuring stiff poses in front of "wrinkled and ill-draped backdrops". Gill worked within the ethnographic, historical, and anthropometric demands of the BAE alongside his own artistic goals, with full body shots mainly serving to document clothing rather than the subject themselves.

Gill's initial closer-framed portraits, showing just the head and shoulders, were likewise described by Glenn as "crowded" and "ill-framed". However, Glenn saw a significant improvement over the course of Gill's early career, with his close portraits showing greater artistic intent than full-body shots. He would take great care to edit pieces for prints and publication: a portrait of Wolf Robe was heavily cropped in order to create a more artistic design. The romantic and pictorialist composition of his later work was potentially inspired by the contemporary photography of Native Americans by Edward S. Curtis.

Like that of Curtis, Gill's work has been described as salvage ethnography. The provision of props and clothing for the delegate's portraits, alongside deliberate posing, were accepted during the period as a means to record what was perceived as a vanishing culture. Gill occasionally provided his subjects with anachronistic or outdated clothing, some possibly sourced from Smithsonian collections. In over a dozen cases, subjects from the same delegation were shown with the same clothing and props. One photograph showed a Kickapoo subject wearing Blackfoot leggings and a breechclout from the Iowa or Otoe. Such inaccuracies were ubiquitous among contemporary White photographers of Native Americans. In other cases, Gill photographed "show Indians", performers who wore clothing intended to appeal to public conceptions of Native dress. For unclear purposes, a troupe of four Dakota from the 101 Ranch Wild West Show were each pictured wearing the same headdress, despite wearing separate headgear in a group photo.

Gill's provision of props and clothing to portrait subjects has been criticized for their reinforcement of cultural stereotypes and homogenization of Native American cultures, in lieu of accurate ethnographic representation. Anthropologist and photographer Gene J. Crediford described Gill and other contemporary photographers of Native Americans as "[showing] a disrespect for their subjects in the name of aesthetics." Strictly delineated forms of dress among Native American nations did not emerge due to an active intertribal clothing trade; however, the provision of the articles by photographers such as Gill was made without regard to specific trade connections. Some delegates may have enjoyed the provided "inauthentic" clothing, as many pieces (such as feathers and war bonnets) were generally associated with prestigious status.

=== Personal life ===
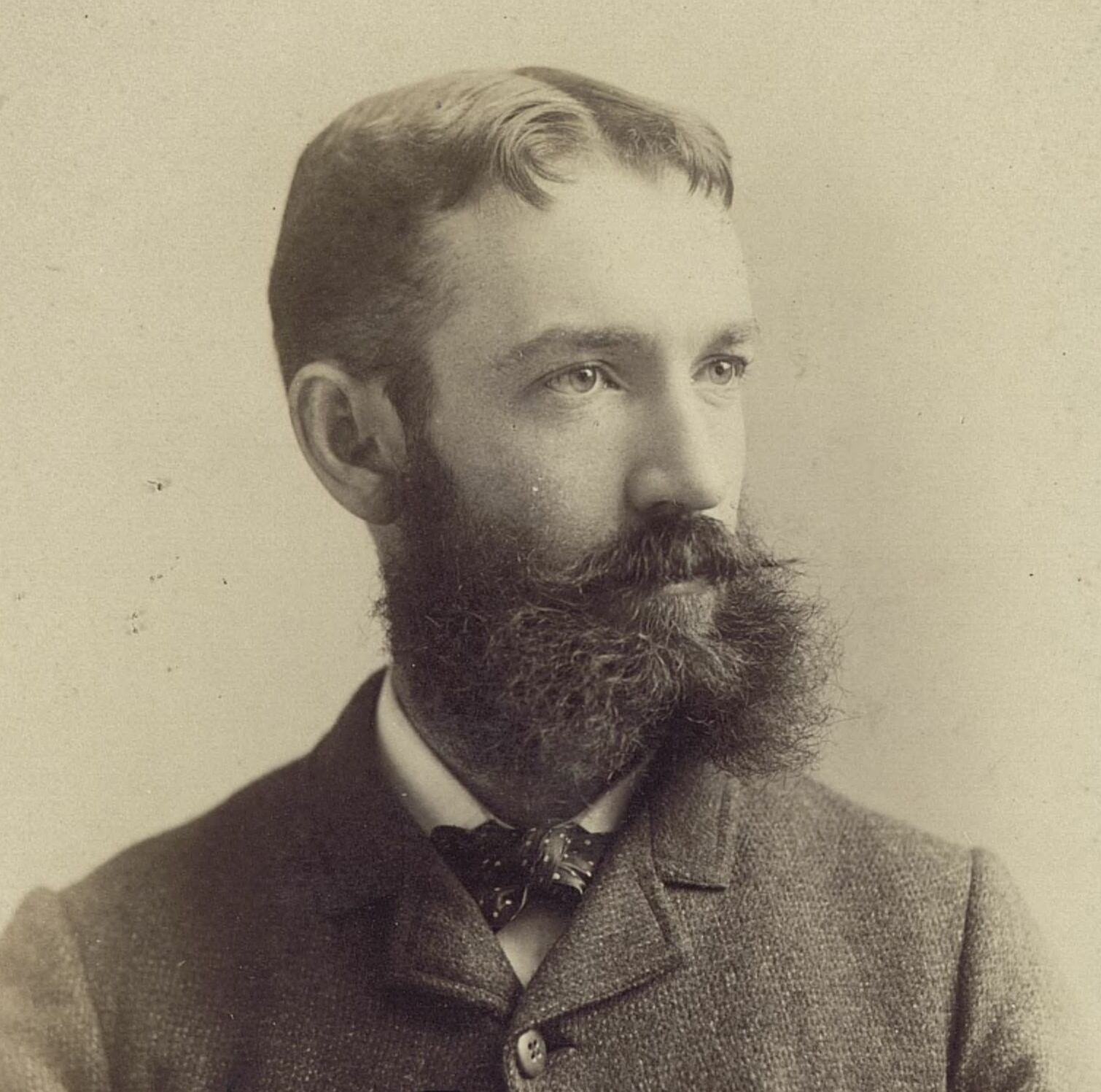
Gill in 1885

Gill married his first wife, Rose DeLima Draper, on May 25, 1881. They had six children before Rose Gill died in 1893, including Robert Gill, a major in the Corps of Engineers. He married fellow Smithsonian illustrator Mary Irwin Wright on August 19, 1895. They had one daughter, Minna P. Gill, who became a prominent suffragist and librarian. They divorced in 1903, but continued to collaborate in their work. On January 2, 1905, he married Katharine Schley Hemmick, with whom he had one child.

Gill was an active cyclist: during the 1880s he served as a team captain of the Capital Bicycle Club, an early American cyclists' organization. He was later a member of the Cosmos Club, the Society of Washington Artists, and the Association of the Oldest Inhabitants of the District of Columbia. He taught painting classes at the Corcoran School of Art and the Art Students League of Washington. He collected and transcribed a large number of African-American spirituals and folk songs. He also collected antiques, and was described as an expert on oriental rugs and East Asian porcelain.

Following his retirement from the Smithsonian, Gill moved to Alexandria, Virginia. He died on August 31, 1940, after fracturing his skull falling down a staircase at his home.

== Notes ==
=== Works cited ===
- American Water Color Society (1890). Illustrated Catalogue of the Twenty-Third Annual Exhibition of the American Water Color Society, Held at the Galleries of the National Academy of Design. New York: National Academy of Design.
- Bettany, George Thomas (1890). The World's Religions: A Popular Account of Religions Ancient and Modern, Including Those of Uncivilised Races, Chaldaeans, Greeks, Egyptions, Romans; Confucianism, Taoism, Hinduism, Buddhism, Zoroastrianism, Mohammedanism, and a Sketch of the History of Judaism and Christianity. London: Ward, Lock & Co. OCLC 705992292.
- Cosentino, Andrew J.; Glassie, Henry H. (1983). The Capital Image: Painters in Washington, 1800–1915. Washington, D.C.: Smithsonian Institution Press. ISBN 978-0-874-74337-1.
- Crediford, Gene J. (2009). Those Who Remain: A Photographer's Memoir of South Carolina Indians. Tuscaloosa: University of Alabama Press. ISBN 978-0-817-35518-0.
- Eldredge, Charles C. (1986). Art in New Mexico, 1900–1945: Paths to Taos and Santa Fe. New York: Abbeville Press. ISBN 978-0-896-59599-6.
- Fleming, Paula Richardson; Luskey, Judith (1986). The North American Indians in Early Photographs. New York: Harper & Row. ISBN 978-0-060-15549-0.
- Glenn, J. R. (1983). "De Lancey W. Gill: Photographer for the Bureau of American Ethnology". History of Photography. 7 (1): 7–22. doi:10.1080/03087298.1983.10442742.
- Gmelch, Sharon (2008). The Tlingit Encounter with Photography. Philadelphia: University of Pennsylvania Press. ISBN 978-1-934-53610-0.
- Goff, Lisa (2016). Shantytown, USA: Forgotten Landscapes of the Working Poor. Cambridge, MA: Harvard University Press. ISBN 978-0-674-66045-8.
- Leatham, Kyle (June 6, 1965). "Clotho's Temple". Arizona Days and Ways Magazine. pp. 18–19. Archived from the original on November 10, 2023.
- Miller, Cheryl (1992). "DeLancey Gill's 100-Year-Old Capital City". Washington History. 4 (1): 90–91. JSTOR 40065276.
- Stoll, Courtney (2003). "Edward S. Curtis's Photographs: Post-Modernism, Re-enactment, and Contextual Value". Kaleidoscope. 2. University of Kentucky. OCLC 1264798187.
- Strathman, Nicole (2020). Through a Native Lens: American Indian Photography. Norman: University of Oklahoma Press. ISBN 9-780-806-16706-0.
- Viola, Herman J. (1981). Diplomats in Buckskins: A History of Indian Delegations in Washington City. Washington, D.C.: Smithsonian Institution Press. ISBN 978-0-874-74944-1.
- Weidman, Paul (May 18, 2012). "Native American Portraits". The Santa Fe New Mexican. Archived from the original on November 13, 2023.
