= W. Lance Bennett =

American political scientist (born 1948)

- Born: April 14, 1948 (age 78)
- Education: Yale University
- Scientific career
- Fields: Political science
- Workplaces: University of Washington

W. Lance Bennett (born 14 April 1948) is an American political scientist.

Bennett earned a doctorate from Yale University in 1974, and subsequently joined the University of Washington faculty, where he serves as Ruddick C. Lawrence Professor of Communication and professor of political science.
