= Joseph Gill =

Joseph Gill may refer to:

- Joseph A. Gill (1854–1933), U. S. District Judge in Indian Territory from 1899 until 1907
- Joseph B. Gill (1862–1942), Lieutenant Governor of Illinois
- Joseph J. Gill (1846–1920), U.S. Representative from Ohio
- Joseph K. Gill (1841–1931), American retailer and publisher in Oregon
- Joseph L. Gill (1885–1972), American Democratic Party politician from Chicago, Illinois
