= Ken Gill (disambiguation) =

Ken Gill may refer to:

- Ken Gill (1927–2009), British trade unionist
- Ken Gill (bishop) (1932–2013), English Anglican bishop
- Ken Gill (rugby league), English rugby league footballer
