= Harry Gill =

Harry Gill may refer to:

- Harry Gill (RAF officer) (1922–2008), British World War II fighter pilot and air vice-marshal
- Harry Gill (architect) (1858–1925), English architect
- Harry Gill (gymnast) (born 1881), British Olympic gymnast
- Harry Gill (politician) (1885–1955), British member of parliament
- Harry Pelling Gill (1855–1916), English-born Australian artist and art teacher
