= Johnny Gill (disambiguation) =

Johnny Gill (born 1966) is an American R&B singer-songwriter.

Johnny Gill may also refer to:

- Johnny Gill (baseball) (1905–1984), Major League Baseball outfielder
- Johnny Gill (1983 album)
- Johnny Gill (1990 album)
- Johnny Ray Gill, (born 1985), American producer, stage and screen actor and director

== See also ==
- John Gill (disambiguation)
