= Gill Livingston =

British psychiatrist

- Education: University of Glasgow
- Occupation: Psychiatrist
- Employer(s): University College London; Royal Free Hospital

Gill Livingston is a British psychiatrist who is Professor of Psychiatry of Older People at University College London. Her research involves a life-course analysis of dementia risk and the development of strategies to delay or prevent dementia. She creates evidence-based interventions to improve the lives of people living with dementia and their families.

== Early life and education ==
Livingston's grandmother emigrated from Eastern Europe to Scotland in the early 1900s. Her father was the first in her family to go to university. Livingston studied medicine at the University of Glasgow. She specialised in psychiatry after a placement in Friern Hospital. Livingston became interested in dementia during her work as clinical psychiatrist, where she observed the difference that family carers made to the prognosis of dementia patients. This motivation to specialise in dementia strengthened after watching both her parents struggle with the condition; her father developed progressive supranuclear palsy and dementia in the 2000s and her mother in the 2010s. Her first senior house officer position was at the Royal Free Hospital.

== Research and career ==
Livingston is an interdisciplinary researcher who combines psychiatry, epidemiological and biopsychosocial enquiry. She was made a professor of Old Age Psychiatry in 2007. Her research investigates new modifiable risk factors for dementia risk, the impact of hearing impairments, and how to help the families of people living with dementia. She led The Lancet Commission on Dementia Prevention, Intervention and Care. She combines new research with meta analysis to develop better understanding of dementia risk. Her research has influenced UK and US policy on dementia risk, and revealed evidence-based interventions that could improve the lives of people with dementia.

Livingston pioneered the STrAtegies for RelaTives (START) programme, an 8 session intervention that helps the carers of people with dementia develop coping strategies. START increases the quality of life and reduces incidence of depression amongst the carers of people living with dementia. She also launched the MARQUE project, a 5-year programme that looked to understand agitation, dementia and how to achieve culture change in care homes. In 2024 she reported that half of dementia cases could be prevented or delayed by addressing various risk factors, particularly high low-density lipoprotein (LDL) or "bad" cholesterol, social isolation and lower levels of education.

== Selected publications ==
- Livingston, Gill; Huntley, Jonathan; Andrew Sommerlad; et al. (2020). "Dementia prevention, intervention, and care: 2020 report of the Lancet Commission". The Lancet. doi:10.1016/s0140-6736(20)30367-6. PMC 7392084. PMID 32738937. Wikidata Q98186330.
- Livingston, Gill; Sommerlad, Andrew; Vasiliki Orgeta; et al. (2017). "Dementia prevention, intervention, and care". The Lancet. 390 (10113): 2673–2734. doi:10.1016/s0140-6736(17)31363-6. PMID 28735855. Wikidata Q34558884.
- Harold, Denise; Richard Abraham; Hollingworth, Paul; et al. (2009). "Genome-wide association study identifies variants at CLU and PICALM associated with Alzheimer's disease". Nature Genetics. 41 (10): 1088–93. doi:10.1038/ng.440. PMC 2845877. PMID 19734902. Wikidata Q24612662.
