= Tom Gill (anthropologist) =

British social anthropologist

Thomas Paramor Gill (born 1960) is a Japan-based social anthropologist whose research has focused mainly on marginal groups in Japanese society.

He was born in Portsmouth, UK, and got his doctorate in social anthropology from the London School of Economics in 1996. His thesis was titled Men of uncertainty: The social organization of day labourers in contemporary Japan. He was managing editor of Social Science Japan Journal from 1999 to 2003, since when he has been a professor at the Faculty of International Studies of Meiji Gakuin University, Yokohama, Japan.

Gill has written many papers in English and Japanese on casual labor, homelessness and masculinity. A book, Men of Uncertainty: the Social Organization of Day Laborers in Contemporary Japan, was published by State University of New York Press in 2001. A review in Cornell University's ILR Review stated "Men of Uncertainty not only is a brilliant case study of Japanese day laborers, but also eloquently demonstrates that the Japanese industrial relations system as a whole is far more complex than some have led us to believe." Gill specializes in street ethnography and has spent extended periods with homeless men in Japan, the US and the UK.

Since 2011, he has been researching the social impacts of the Fukushima nuclear disaster. His paper on the irradiated hamlet of Nagadoro is included in the collection Japan Copes with Calamity: Ethnographies of the Earthquake, Tsunami and Nuclear Disasters of 2011 (Peter Lang 2013), which he co-edited with Brigitte Steger and David Slater. A Japanese version has also been published, in Higashi Nihon Daishinsai no Jinruigaku (Anthropology of the Great East Japan Disaster, Jinbun Shoin, 2013).

Gill has a side interest in classic Japanese manga, and has published several papers on Yoshiharu Tsuge.

== Books ==
- Globalization and Social Change in Contemporary Japan, ed. J.S. Eades, Tom Gill, Harumi Befu. Melbourne: Trans Pacific Press, 2000.
- "Whose problem? Japan's Homeless as an Issue of Local and Central Governance." In The Political Economy of Governance in Japan, ed. Glenn Hook. London and New York Routledge, 2005, pp. 192–210.
- "The Incident at Nishibeta Village: A Classic Manga by Yoshiharu Tsuge from the Garo Years." In International Journal of Comic Art, pp. Vol. 13 No. 1: 474-489.
