= John Gill (footballer, born 1903) =

English footballer

Personal information
- Date of birth: 1903
- Place of birth: Crook, England
- Position: Goalkeeper

Senior career*
Years	Team	Apps	(Gls)
- Crook Town
- Bearpark Welfare
- Bolton Wanderers
1930–1933	Bradford City	86	(0)
- Clapton Orient
- Accrington Stanley
- Great Harwood
- * Club domestic league appearances and goals

John J. A. Gill (born 1903) was an English professional footballer who played as a goalkeeper.

== Career ==
Born in Crook, County Durham, Gill played for Crook Town, Bearpark Welfare, Bolton Wanderers, Bradford City, Clapton Orient, Accrington Stanley and Great Harwood. For Bradford City, he made 86 appearances in the Football League; he also made 3 FA Cup appearances.

== Sources ==
- Frost, Terry (1988). Bradford City A Complete Record 1903-1988. Breedon Books Sport. ISBN 0-907969-38-0.
