= Mary Wright Gill =

American scientific illustrator (1867–1929)

- Born: May 19, 1867; Washington, D.C., U.S.
- Died: October 30, 1929 (aged 62); Washington, D.C., U.S.
- Education: University of Cincinnati
- Spouse: DeLancey Walker Gill
- Scientific career
- Fields: scientific illustration
- Workplaces: Bureau of American Ethnology

Mary Wright Gill (née Wright; May 19, 1867 – October 30, 1929) was an American scientific illustrator who worked for the Bureau of American Ethnology (BAE) and other government agencies in the late-19th and early-20th centuries. She was married to BAE illustrator and photographer DeLancey Walker Gill.

== Early life ==
Mary Wright Gill was born on May 19, 1867, in Washington, D.C. She was the daughter of Minna Wright (d. 1908) and had a brother, John Newton Wright. As a girl, due to health issues, she was taken out of school and enrolled in the School of Design at the University of Cincinnati, and became the youngest student ever to enroll in that program. When she returned to Washington, she began drawing on contract with the BAE under the direction of John Wesley Powell.

Some of her early work was featured as part of the Smithsonian's contributions to the Centennial Exposition of the Ohio Valley and Central States. In 1891, her work was featured in an exhibition for the Society of Washington Artists in the Woodward & Lothrop gallery. In an article about the exhibition, a reporter noted that (then) Mary Irwin Wright, through paid black and white illustrations for magazines like the Century and St. Nicholas and commissioned works while abroad in London, "has already made considerable reputation and enough money to buy a house on Capitol Hill." She graduated from the University of Cincinnati School of Design with a degree in drawing and design in 1893. She also studied in New York with Kenyon Cox and in Washington with Edwin H. Blashfield.

== Career ==
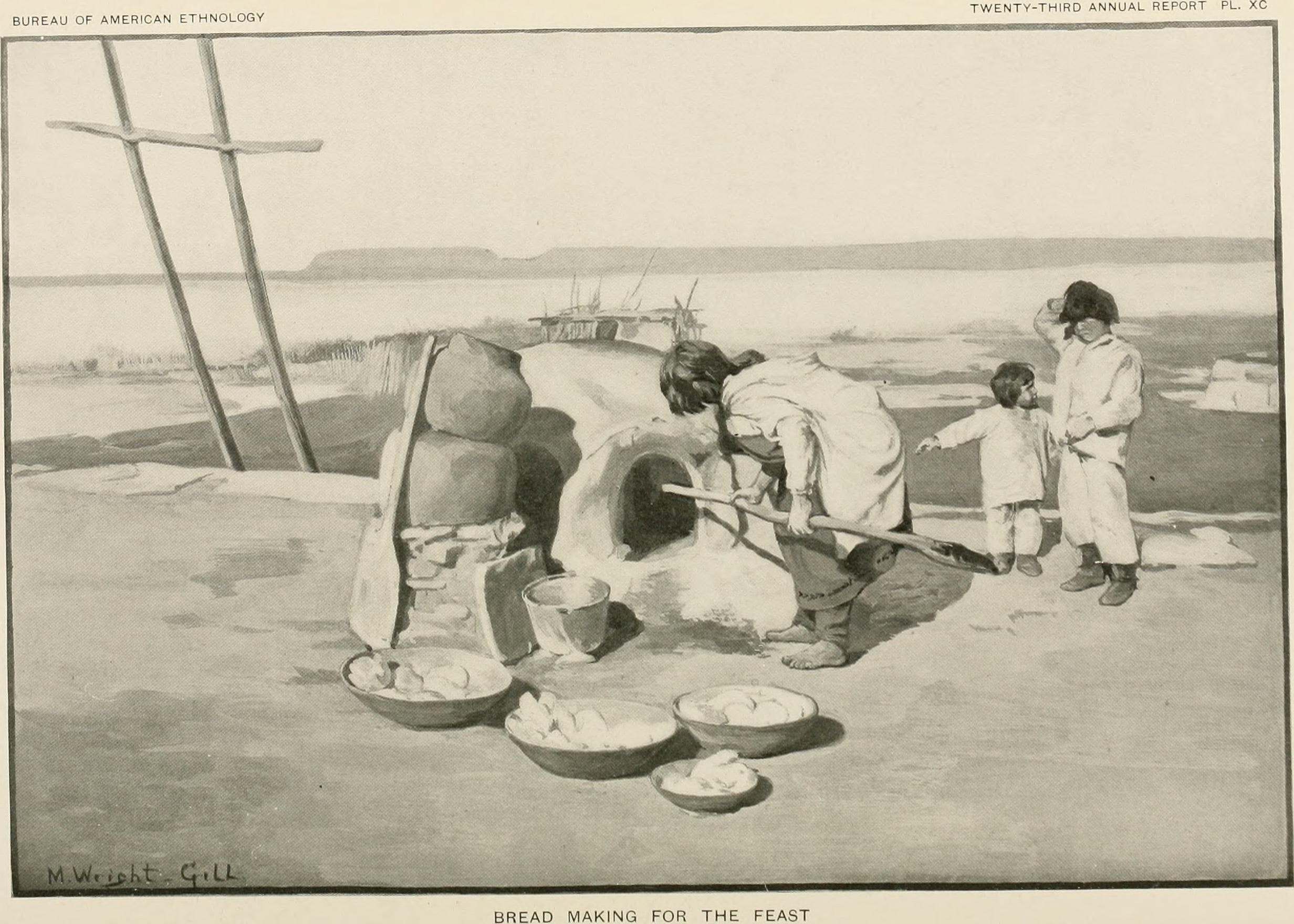
Bread for Making the Feast, Plate XC, The Zuni Indians, Matilda Coxe Stevenson

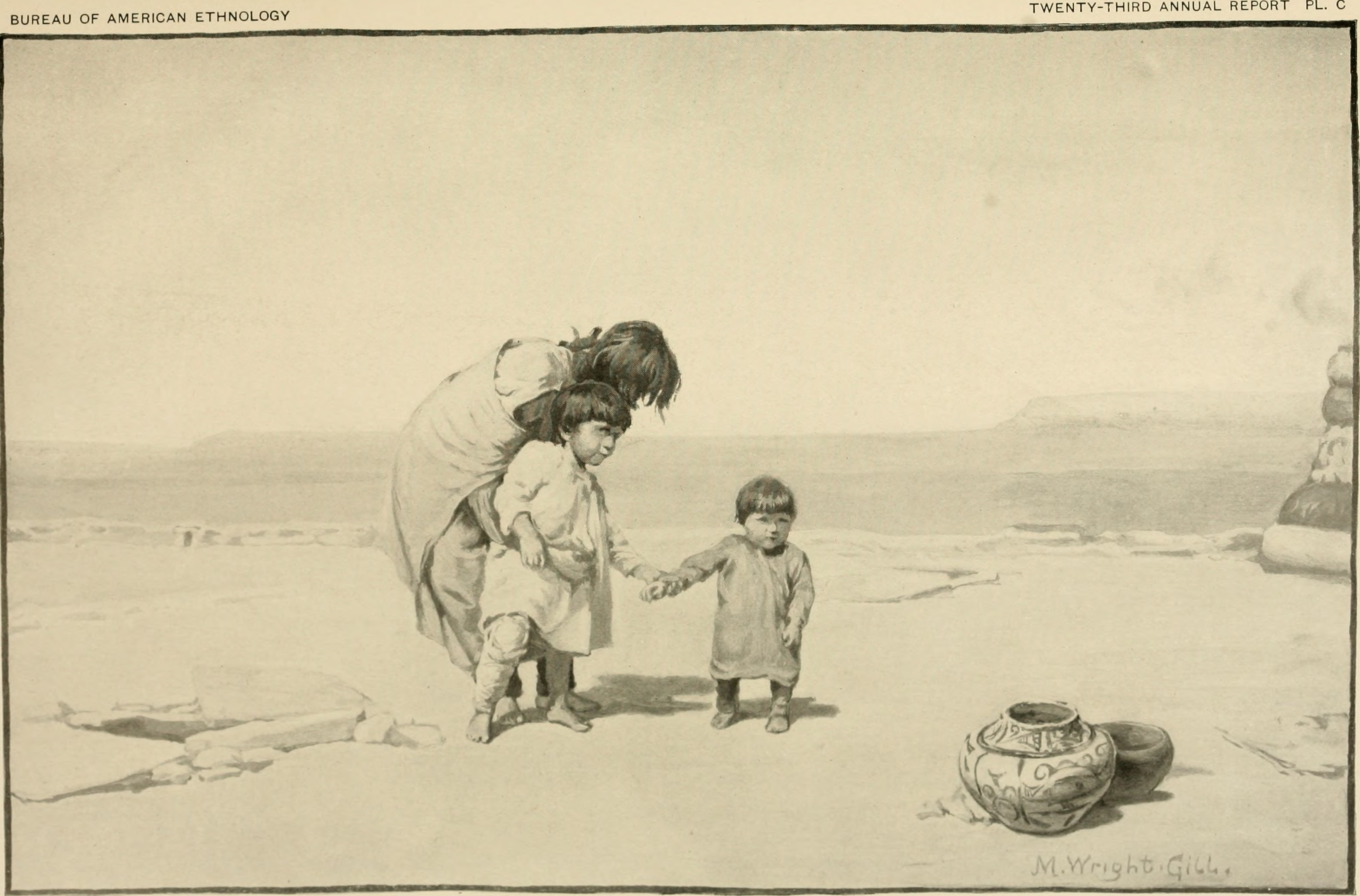
Child with Broken Leg in Splints, Plate C, The Zuni Indians, Matilda Coxe Stevenson

Mary Wright Gill was renowned for her drawings of "fidelity and accuracy." She worked as a contract artist for the Bureau of American Ethnology and produced many of the illustrations used in the BAE's annual reports, such as Matilda Coxe Stevenson's The Zuni Indians. She worked primarily in pen and ink, graphite, and watercolor. Her watercolor illustrations were sometimes composites based on series of photographs, lending them a hyperreal quality.

Some of her illustrations, like the photographs taken by Stevenson, were not made with the same ethical protocols observed by ethnographers and documentarians today, and are considered culturally sensitive by contemporary Pueblo communities.

In addition to those for the BAE, she illustrated many notable publications and books, including the Manual of the Grasses, by Albert Spear Hitchcock. During her career, she had formative friendships with prominent women illustrators such as Mary Agnes Chase; the two were among a group of women who had created a niche in the government for this professional line of work. They also had a playful relationship; Mary Wright Gill illustrated a children's book Chase created of an orphaned squirrel she "adopted" and named "Toodles."

== Death and legacy ==
Mary Wright Gill died on October 30, 1929, in Washington, D.C.
