= Gill Sanderson =

Gill Sanderson is the pen name of Roger Sanderson, a prolific author of romance novels for publisher Mills and Boon. As of 2015, Sanderson is the only male author writing for Mills and Boon; he chose to publish under his wife's name instead of his own.

Before writing romances, Sanderson wrote for Commando war comics. After reading several Mills and Boon romance novels, he and his wife began writing novels together. Sanderson soon began writing novels by himself but chose to use his wife's name for publication.

Sanderson has written more than 50 novels, which have sold a combined three million copies. Many of his books are medical romances. Jay Dixon, a scholar of romance novels, described Sanderson as "one of the few men who does have the knack" of writing from the perspective of a female.

Sanderson was featured in the documentary Guilty Pleasures.
