= Majithia =

Majithia is a surname. Notable people with the surname include:

- Bikram Singh Majithia, Indian politician
- Dyal Singh Majithia (1848-1898), Indian banker and activist
- Surjit Singh Majithia, Indian politician, diplomat and air force officer
- Ganieve Kaur Majithia, Indian politician
- Sundar Singh Majithia, Indian politician
- Lehna Singh Majithia, Governor of Lahore
- Ranjodh Singh Majithia, Warrior of the Sikh Empire
- Dalip Singh Majithia (1920–2024), Indian Air Force pilot
- Desa Singh Majithia (1768–1832), Sikh general
- Amar Singh Majithia

== See also ==
- Majithia family
