= Majitha =

- Town
- Location in Punjab, India
- Coordinates: 31.76°N 74.95°E
- Country: India
- State: Punjab
- District: Amritsar

Government
  - Type: state government

Population (2011)
  - Total: 14,503

Languages
  - Official: Punjabi
- Time zone: UTC+5:30 (IST)
- Postal code: 143601
- Vehicle registration: PB-81

Majitha is a town and a municipal council in Amritsar district in the Indian state of Punjab. The 2011 Census of India recorded the town population at 14,503.

The renowned Majithia family of Sardars of the Sher-Gill Jat clan trace their origins to Majithia and adopted the name of the town as their surname.

== Etymology ==
The original name of the town, Madho-Jetha, became contracted into Majitha over time.

== History ==
The town was founded by a man named Madho, a Jat of the Gill clan. Since he was the eldest son of his father, the town was named 'Madho-Jetha' (jetha means 'elder' or 'firstborn' in Punjabi). Madho is believed to be an ancestor of the Majithia family.

== Demographics ==
The table below shows the population of different religious groups in Majitha city and their gender ratio, as of 2011 census.

Population by religious groups in Majitha city, 2011 census
Religion	Total	Female	Male	Gender ratio
Sikh	10,172	4,821	5,351	900
Hindu	3,907	1,842	2,065	892
Christian	344	158	186	849
Muslim	55	30	25	1200
Buddhist	5	2	3	666
Jain	1	1	0	--
Other religions	6	4	2	500
Not stated	13	6	7	857
Total	14,503	6,864	7,639	898

== Politics ==
The city is part of the Majitha Assembly Constituency.

== Notable people ==
- Desa Singh Majithia (1768–1832) was a Jat Sikh Jagirdar, Military general and a Statesman.
- Amar Singh Majithia (d 1822) was the governor of Hazara region in the Sikh Empire from 1820 until his death.
- Lehna Singh Majithia (d. 1854)
- Ranjodh Singh Majithia (d. 1872)
- Dyal Singh Majithia (1848–1898)
- Surat Singh (1810–1881), zamindar and military officer in the Khalsa Army In 1877, he was awarded the title of Raja and made a Companion of the Star of India.
- Sundar Singh Majithia (1872–1941), landowner and politician. He was a member of Khalsa Nationalist Party and Revenue Member at the first and second legislative councils of the Punjab Legislative Assembly. The first president of the Shiromani Gurdwara Parbandhak Committee
- Umrao Singh Sher-Gil (1870–1954) aristocrat and a scholar in Sanskrit and Persian and Father of Amrita Sher-Gil
- Amrita Sher-Gil (1913–1941, through her father, Umrao Singh Sher-Gil), Hungarian-Indian painter. Daughter of Umrao Singh
- Surjit Singh Majithia (1912-1995) was an Indian diplomat, an Indian Air force officer and was elected to the Lok Sabha, the lower house of the Parliament of India from the Tarn Taran constituency of Punjab.
- Wing Commander Surjit Singh Majithia (1912–1995), Indian politician, diplomat, and air force officer. Son of Sundar Singh Majithia
- Satyajit Singh Majithia, educationist, industrialist, philanthropist, and Chancellor of Khalsa University. Son of Sardar Surjit Singh Majithia, former Deputy Defence Minister
- Harsimrat Kaur Badal, a former Union Cabinet Minister of Food Processing Industries. Daughter of Satyajit Singh Majithia
- Bikram Singh Majithia, a former cabinet minister in the Punjab Government. Son of Satyajit Singh Majithia
