= Sikh 100 =

The Sikh 100
- Awarded for: "annual ranking of some of the most influential Sikhs from around the world and across all sectors"
- Date: Annually since 2012
- Presented by: The Sikh Group
- Website: www.thesikh100.com

The Sikh 100 is an annual listicle of the 100 most influential Sikhs in the world assembled by a global Sikh organization "The Sikh Group". In 2020 the 9th edition was announced.

== Multiple appearances ==
Jathedars of Hazur Sahib, Akaal Takht Sahib, Budha Dal and Shaheedan Tarna Dal are consistently in the top five in the rankings. The President of Shiromani Gurdwara Parbandhak Committee (S.G.P.C) has also recently featured in the top 5.

Many Sikhs have been featured on list multiple times:

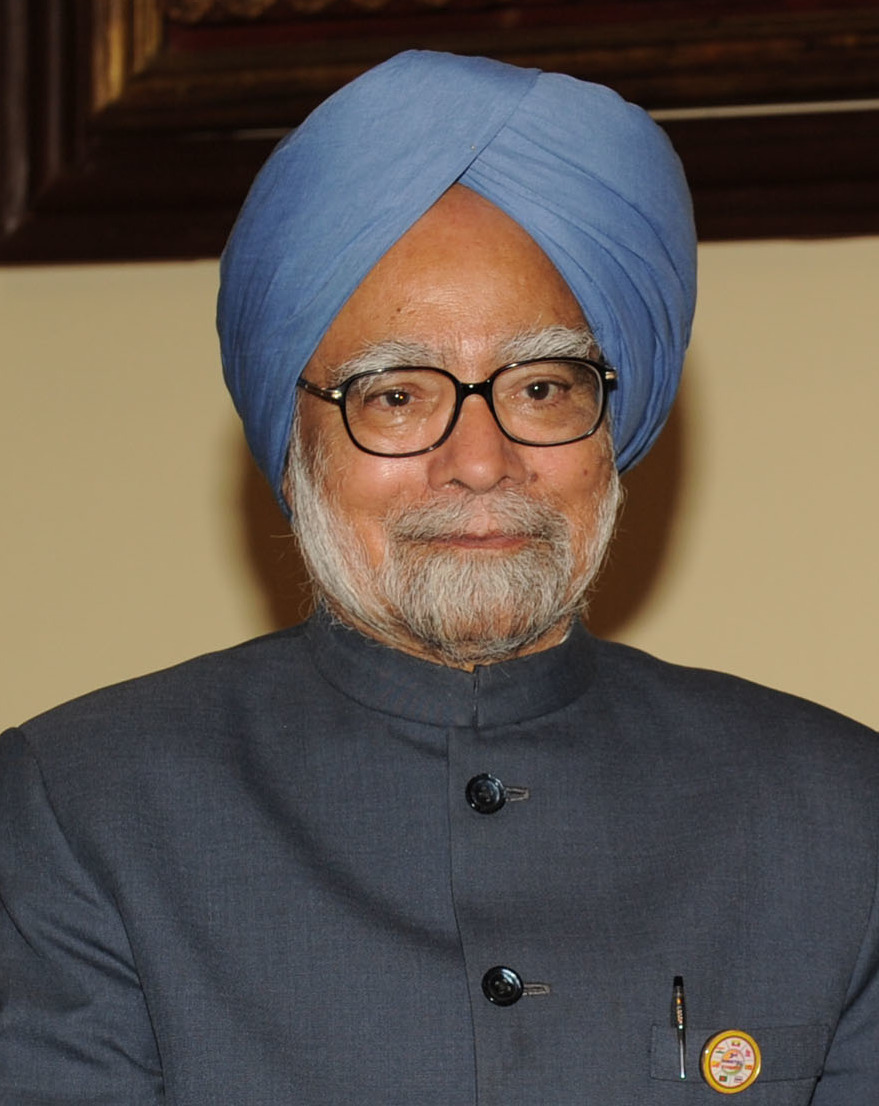
Manmohan Singh
Listed seven times: 2012 (1), 2013 (1), 2016 (7), 2017 (7), 2018 (10), 2019 (11), 2020 (12)

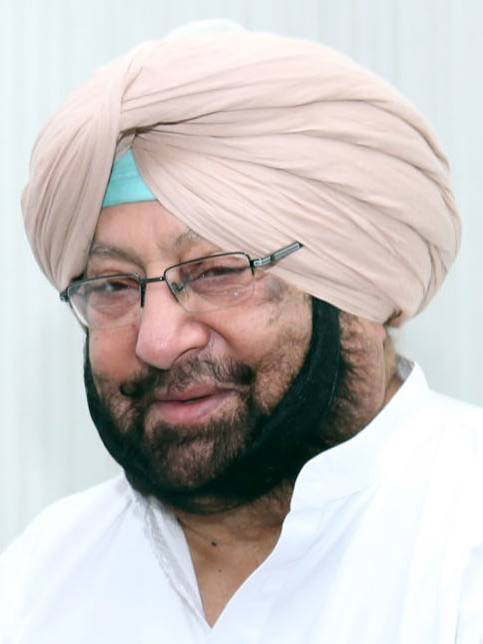
Amarinder Singh
Listed nine times: 2020 (4), 2019 (4), 2018 (4), 2017 (4), 2016 (35), 2015 (29), 2014 (29), 2013 (29), 2012 (29)

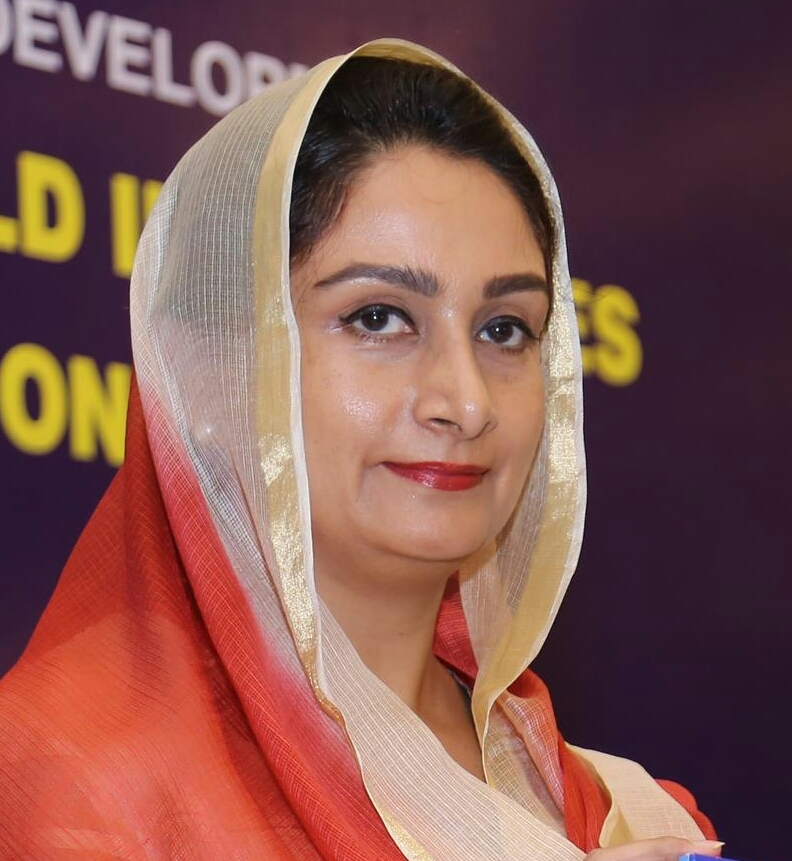
Harsimrat Kaur Badal
Listed six times: 2019 (13), 2018 (16), 2017 (19), 2016 (19), 2015 (16), 2014 (16)

== History ==
=== 2020 ===
In 2020, a Sikh 100 Under 30 list was also released. Actor and singer Diljit Dosanjh made his debut in the 2020 list.
