= Madhur Kapila =

Indian novelist, journalist, and writer (1942–2021)

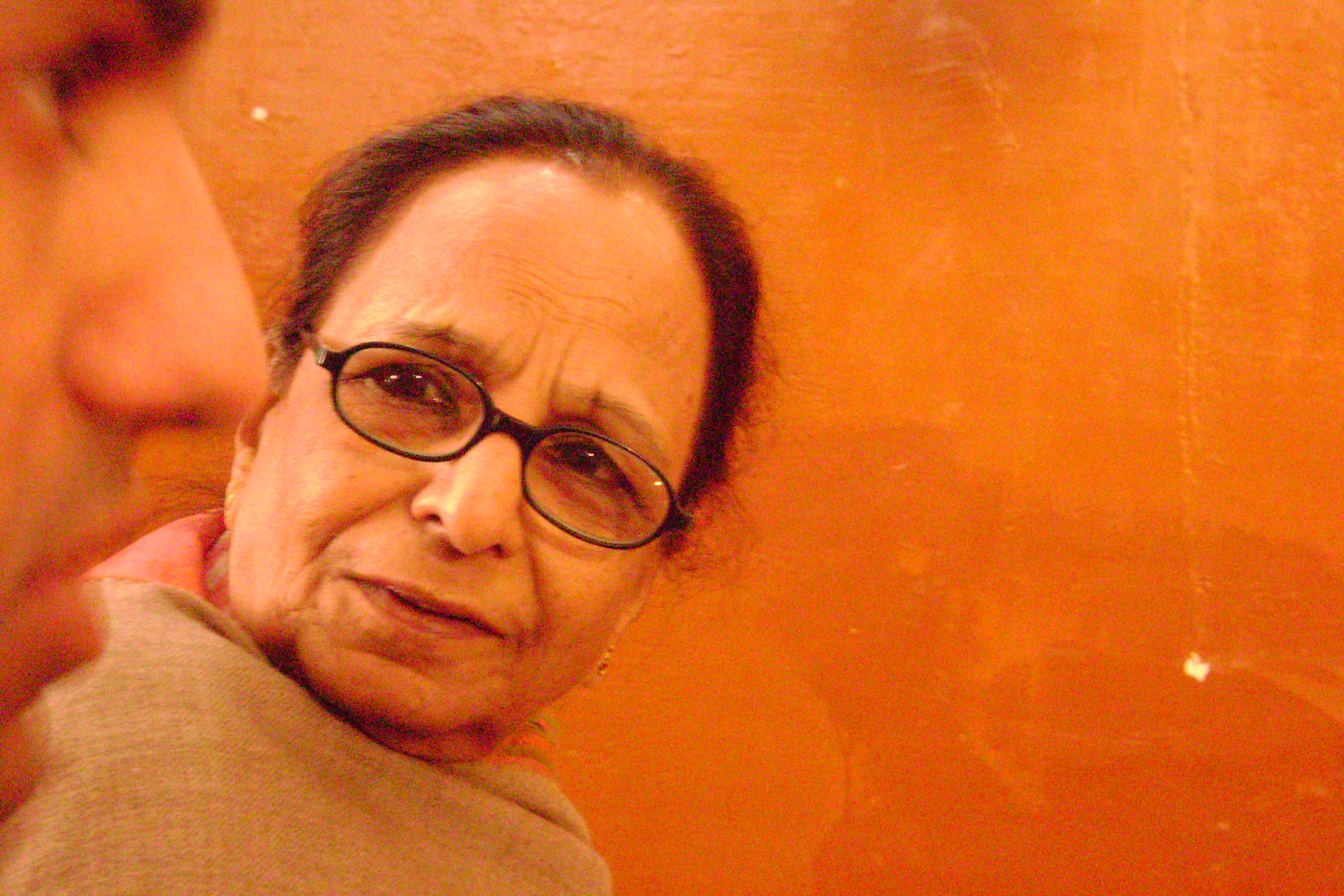
- Born: 15 April 1942; Jalandhar, British India
- Died: 19 December 2021 (aged 79); Chandigarh, India
- Occupations: Writer, journalist, art critic
- Writing career
- Language: Hindi

Madhur Kapila (15 April 1942 – 19 December 2021) was an Indian novelist, journalist, art critic and a reviewer of Hindi literature.

Some of her published works included Bhatke Raahi (transl. Wandered), Satwan Swar (transl. Seventh vowel) and Saamne ka Aasman (transl. The sky in front).

Her last novel Nishesh was published posthumously in January 2024 by Penguin Random House India.

She was a recipient of the Chandigarh Sahitya Akademi Award for lifetime contributions to literature and the Cultural Representative Award from the Punjab Sangeet Natak Akademi.

== Early life ==
Kapila was born in Jalandhar, Punjab, in what was then British India, on 15 April 1942. She was introduced to Hindustani classical music in her childhood at the Harballabh Sangeet Sammelan.

== Career ==
Madhur Kapila started her writing career early when she was aged 12. Her first novel Bhatke Rahi (Hindi: भटके रही) told the story of a woman through her experiences during the Partition of India and following the country's independence in 1947. She moved to Chandigarh in 1977 after her marriage to journalist Ramesh Kapila. During this time she emerged as an art critic and contributed to many newspapers and magazines as a freelance journalist and an art critic. The Dainik Tribune, Dinaman, the Punjab Kesari, the Jansatta, Hindi Hindustan newspapers and various literary journals and magazines such as Hans, Vartamaan Sahitya, Vaagarth, Naya Gyanodaya (Bharatiya Jnanpith), Dastak, Irawati, Harigandha, Jaagriti and many more have published her short stories and literary columns, including the Kala Kshetraya – a weekly art and literature column in the Dainik Tribune which also serialized and published her first novel Satwan Swar (Hindi: सातवाँ स्वर). In a later interview, Kapila would note that an interview of the Hindi author and playwright, Bhisham Sahni, was her first journalistic assignment.

Her first story was published in 1960 in the Veer Pratap, a newspaper from Jullundur. She subsequently published three novels, including Bhatke Raahi (Hindi: भटके राही; transl. Wandered), Satwan Swar (Hindi: सातवाँ स्वर; transl. Seventh vowel) and Saamne ka Aasman (Hindi: सामने का आसमान; transl. The sky in front); three short story collections – Beechon Beech (Hindi: बीचों बीच; transl. In the middle), Tab Shayad (Hindi: तब शायद; transl. Then maybe) and Ek Muqadama Aur (Hindi: एक मुक़दमा और; transl. One more case). Her published novel Saamne ka Aasmaan (Hindi: सामने का आसमान) told the story of three individuals from different strata of the society coming together and living a shared experience at a theater. She also wrote a book on Indian classical singer, Pandit Jasraj. Her works were noted for narratives in simple language, often written with central women characters and their experiences and emotions in a male-dominated society.

She was a member of the Chandigarh Sangeet Natak Akademi for over three decades. Her stories have been translated into Indian and foreign languages including Punjabi, Telugu and English. English translations of her stories have been included in the anthology "Flowing like a River".

Her last novel Nishesh (Hindi: नि:शेष) was published posthumously in January 2024 by Penguin Random House India.

The novel Nishesh was subsequently featured and showcased as a bestseller at the New Delhi World Book Fair 2024 organised by The National Book Trust, India, a part of the Ministry of Education India of the Government of India.

== Awards ==
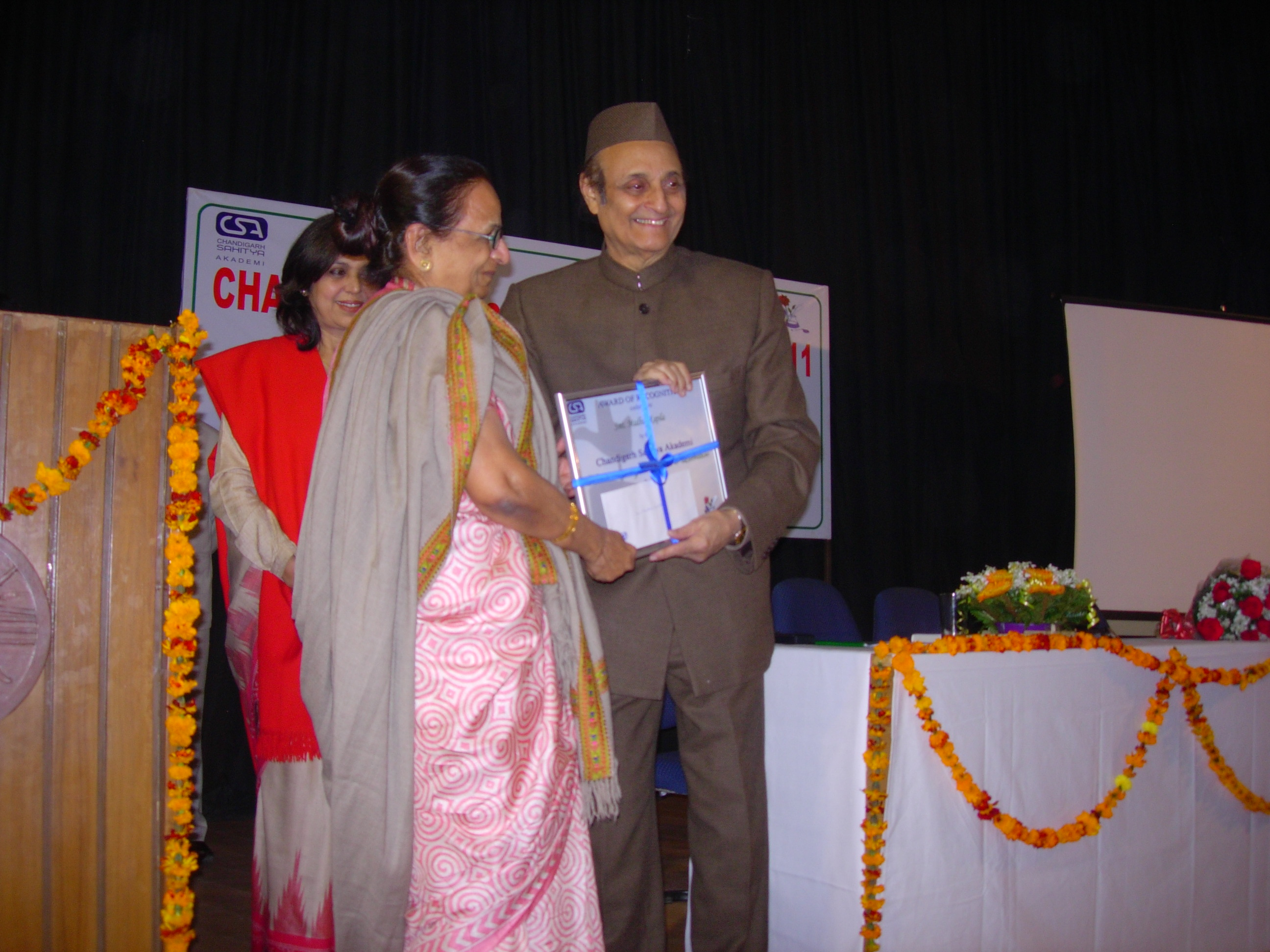
Kapila receiving the Chandigarh Sahitya Akademi lifetime achievement award (2011) from Karan Singh

In 2011, Kapila received the Chandigarh Sahitya Akademi Award for her outstanding contribution to literature. She was also a recipient of the Cultural Representative Award from the Punjab Sangeet Natak Akademi and was noted as one of 111 Hindi female writers of the 21st century by The Sunday Indian.

== Personal life ==
Kapila was married to journalist Ramesh Kapila, who worked with The Indian Express. The couple had three children; two daughters and a son. Her daughter Shruti Kapila is a published author and an associate professor of history at the University of Cambridge.

Kapila died from a cardiac arrest on 19 December 2021, at the age of 79 at her home in Chandigarh.

== Bibliography ==
=== Novels ===
- Bhatke Rahi भटके राही.
- Satwan Swar सातवाँ स्वर. Kriti Prakashan. 2002. ISBN 81-8060-066-1.
- Saamne ka Aasman सामने का आसमान. Bharatiya Jnanpith. 2010. ISBN 978-81-263-2002-8.
- Nishesh नि:शेष. Penguin Random House India. 2024. ISBN 978-0-14-345717-6.

=== Short story collections ===
- Beechon Beech बीचों बीच. Abhivyakti Prakashan. 1993.
- Tab Shayad तब शायद. Shila Lekh. 2004.
- Ek Muqadma Aur एक मुक़दमा और. Shila Lekh. 2008. ISBN 978-81-7329-208-8.

== See also ==
- Indian literature
- Hindi literature
- List of Indian writers
