= Tarkulha Devi Temple =

Hindu Temple in Uttar Pradesh, India

- Location in Uttar Pradesh

Religion
- Affiliation: Hinduism
- District: Gorakhpur
- Deity: Durga (as Tarkulha Devi)
- Festivals: Navratri, Rama Navami
- Governing body: Temple Trust

Location
- Location: Tarkulha
- State: Uttar Pradesh
- Country: India
- Interactive map of Tarkulha Devi Temple
- Coordinates: 26.653297°N 83.538309°E

Architecture
- Style: Hindu temple architecture

Tarkulha Devi Temple is a Hindu temple dedicated to the goddess Tarkulha Devi (Durga), located in Gorakhpur, Uttar Pradesh.

== History ==
Tarkulha Devi is believed to be one associated with the Goddess Durga. Her name is derived from the "tarkul" tree, meaning palm tree.

The temple is particularly significant due to its association with the Indian independence movement. Freedom fighter Bandhu Singh considered Tarkulha Devi as his Ishta Devi (chosen deity). He is said to have worshiped at the temple before carrying out guerilla warfare tactics against the British.

The temple's tradition of animal sacrifice is linked to the martyrdom of Bandhu Singh, who used to offer sacrifices to the goddess and even sacrificed the heads of British soldiers. His ultimate sacrifice at the hands of the British on August 12, 1857, led to the temple becoming a place of worship and reverence for devotees seeking blessings and protection.

In September 2019, the chief minister of Uttar Pradesh, Yogi Adityanath sanctioned ₹2.14 crore for the development of the Tarkulha Devi Temple as a tourist destination. The government released ₹ 88 lakh to the executing agency.

== Rituals and practices ==
Devotees visiting the Tarkulha Devi Temple engage in various rituals, with animal sacrifice being a prominent practice. Goats are sacrificed as offerings to the goddess, especially during Navaratri, with the meat distributed as consecrated food (Prasada) among the faithful. Those who prefer not to participate in animal sacrifice, offer coconuts to the deity. The temple also serves as a venue for religious ceremonies like mundan (head shaving) and janeu (sacred thread) rituals.

The temple celebrates Chaitra Rama Navami with grand festivities, including a large fair. Devotees from nearby areas, including Bihar and Nepal, visit to take part in the rituals and seek blessings from Goddess Tarkulha.

== Location ==
The temple is about 22 kilometres from Gorakhpur's district headquarters. Visitors can reach the temple from the main road by walking around 1.5 kilometres or using a private vehicle or rickshaw. It is 5 kilometres from Chauri Chaura.
