= Amar Shaheed Bandhu Singh =

Martyr Amar Shaheed Bandhu Singh
- Raja Saheb
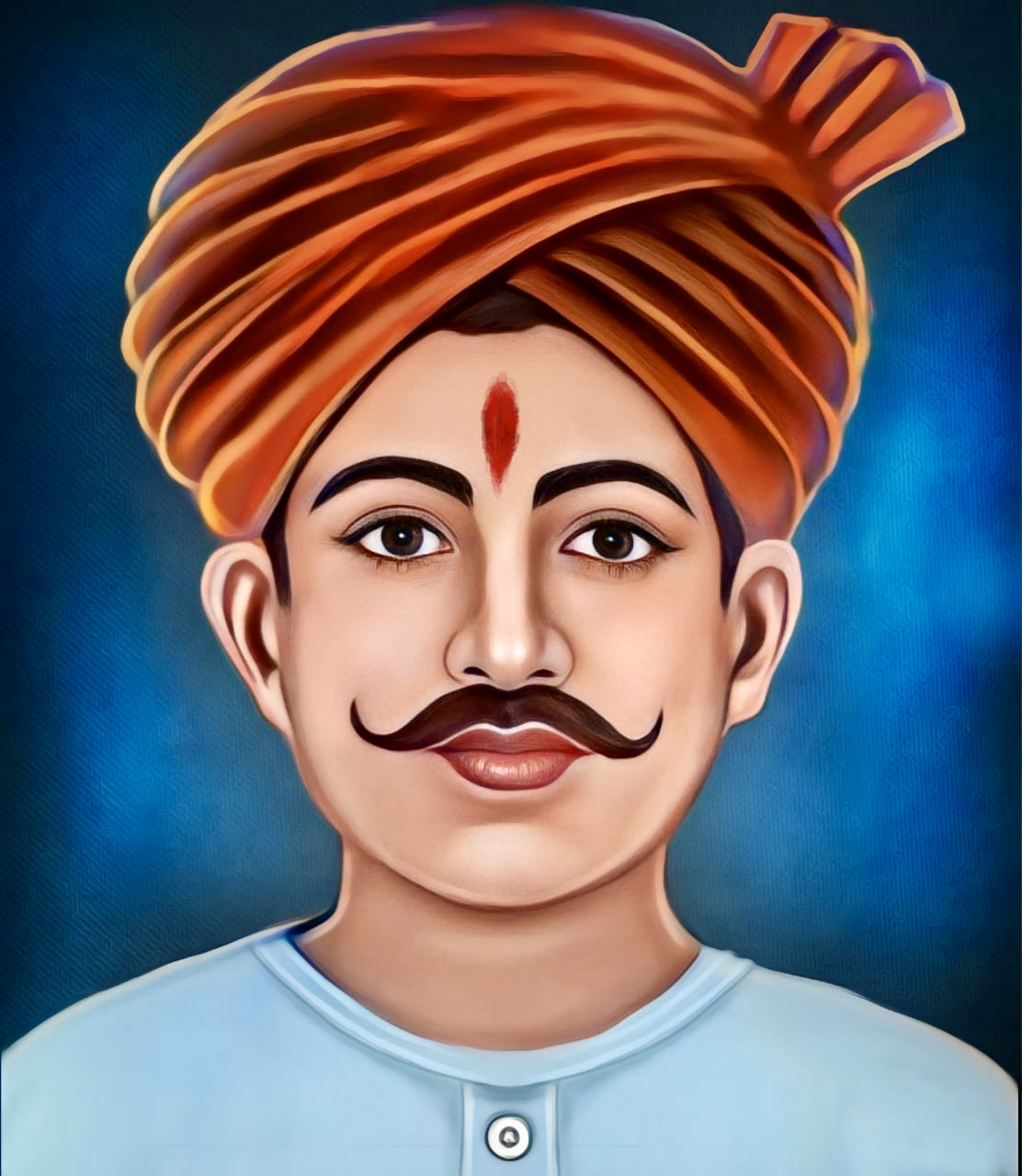
- Born: 1 May 1833; Dumari, Gorakhpur
- Died: 12 August 1858; Gorakhpur, Dominion of India
- Resting place: Shaheed Bandhu Singh Smarak, Gorakhpur; 26.3911°N 82.3216°E
- Other names: Bandhu Singh
- Known for: Freedom fighter, Indian revolutionary
- Criminal status: Executed by hanging

Amar Shaheed Bandhu Singh Shrinet was a prominent freedom fighter in eastern Uttar Pradesh who fought against the British Raj using Guerilla Warfare.

Bandhu Singh Ji was born on 1 May 1833 in a Shrinet Rajput Principality to Babu Shiv Prasad Singh of Dumari Riyasat. He was a devotee of Tarkulaha Devi. He was finally arrested by the British along with Shivgobind Chand of Chillupar, Gorakhpur. He was hanged publicly at Ali Nagar Chauraha in Gorakhpur on 12 August 1858. There is a month-long Mela (funfair) every year starting from Chaitra Ramnavami at the Tarkulaha Devi Temple. People from far-flung locations visit to shop for their annual requirements of garam masala and to enjoy the traditional ‘Nautanki’ (drama), Nag Kanya shows and small circuses.

== History ==
He left the princely state and began living in an unknown location which was characterised by dense forests and the flowing Gurra river. Singh held great devotion to Tarkulaha Devi, the goddess whom he worshipped under a palm (tarkul) tree by the riverbank.

As British oppression grew, so did the unrest among Indians. Bandhu Singh, skilled in guerrilla warfare, became a symbol of defiance. He would ambush British officials passing through the forest, decapitate them, and offer their heads as a tribute at the feet of Tarkulaha Devi, his favored deity. He shook the very foundations of British rule, and is said to have killed the then British collector, even sitting on his chair afterward. This ritual symbolized his fight against colonial tyranny and was fueled by a profound sense of patriotism.

Initially, the British authorities were unaware of the exact cause behind their soldiers’ disappearances in the forest. However, it soon became clear that Bandhu Singh was behind these acts of rebellion. Despite exhaustive searches, the British struggled to capture him due to his mastery of guerrilla tactics.

His fierce demeanour alarmed the British, prompting them to dispatch forces from Banaras. The British set up their camp near Dumri village, but upon learning this, the local villagers raided and seized their weapons and ammunition. Enraged by this, the British set Dumri Khas village on fire, forcing the villagers to flee. Eventually, Surat Singh’s (Father of Sundar Singh Majithia) betrayal led to Singh’s arrest. In exchange Surat was awarded a pension of ₹4,800 per annum, and awarded a jagir in the Dumri Riyasath, Gorakhpur by the british government.

== Execution ==
Bandhu Singh was sentenced to death by public hanging. The execution took place on August 12, 1858, at Ali Nagar Square in Gorakhpur. According to local lore, the British failed to hang him successfully six times. Bandhu Singh then invoked Tarkulha Devi in meditation and vowed for her blessing to face his fate. On the seventh attempt, the execution was successful, an act believed to have been sanctioned by the goddess herself.

== Memorials ==
Over time, after independence, the memory of the martyr Bandhu Singh began to fade. However, his direct descendant, Senior Leader Late Shri Vinay Kumar Singh “Binnu”, established a committee Shaheed Bandhu Singh Smarak Samiti to ensure that his name was recorded in history. After Vinay Kumar Singh’s death, his younger brother, Shri Ajay Kumar Singh “Tappu”, continues the work of keeping Bandhu Singh’s legacy alive. To honour the sacrifice and valour of Shaheed Bandhu Singh, a memorial stands at the site of his martyrdom and in the grounds of Tarkulaha Devi temple as well (Shaheed Bandhu Singh Smarak). Today, the committee oversees several institutions and landmarks named in Bandhu Singh’s honour, including Shaheed Bandhu Singh PG College, Shaheed Bandhu Singh Girls’ Hostel, Shaheed Bandhu Singh Park, Shaheed Bandhu Singh Stadium, Shaheed Bandhu Singh Kisan Sewa Kendra, and various other facilities that commemorate his sacrifice and keep his memory alive. His story continues to inspire generations, symbolising resistance, bravery, and unwavering devotion to the cause of freedom.
