= Ranjodh Singh Majithia =

Warrior of the Sikh Empire

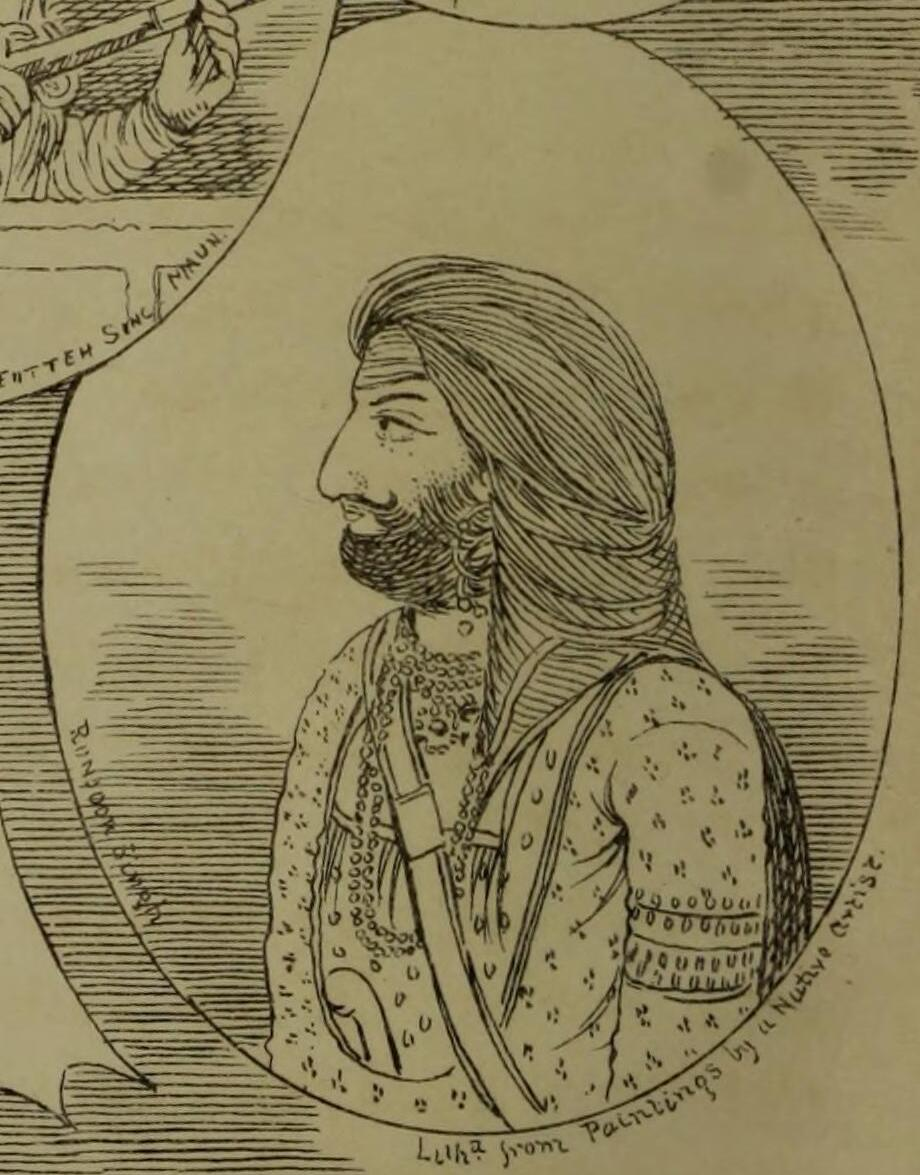
- Portrait published in 'A History of the Reigning Family of Lahore' (1847)
- Died: 1872
- Relatives: Desa Singh Majithia (father); Lehna Singh Majithia (brother); Gujar Singh Majithia (brother)
- Military career
- Allegiance: Sikh Empire
- Branch: Sikh Khalsa Army
- Rank: General of the Sikh Khalsa Army; Governor of Hazara

Ranjodh Singh (died 1872) was a powerful member of the Sikh aristocracy and governor of Hazara. The Majithia family are Jat of the Shergill gotra (clan), and were particularly influential in the area near their headquarters in Majithia (hence the name).

== Biography ==
=== Early life ===
Ranjodh's father was Desa Singh Majithia. Ranjodh Singh's brother was Lehna Singh Majithia, one of Ranjit Singh's most able ministers and advisers. He also had a brother named Gujar Singh. Ranjodh Singh himself was from a young age tutored by French officers in military matters. Due to this education and his inherited position he became a general in the Khalsa Army.

=== First Anglo-Sikh War ===
During the First Anglo Sikh War he led a Sikh army that fought the British at Aliwal, Baddowal and fought bravely at Sobraon and suffered many wounds. He defeated the British at the Battle of Badowal but was defeated in battle of Aliwal which was more of an ambush on a retreating party of his army. His skill and ability was noted by his British opponents.
