= Sundar Singh Majithia =

Indian politician

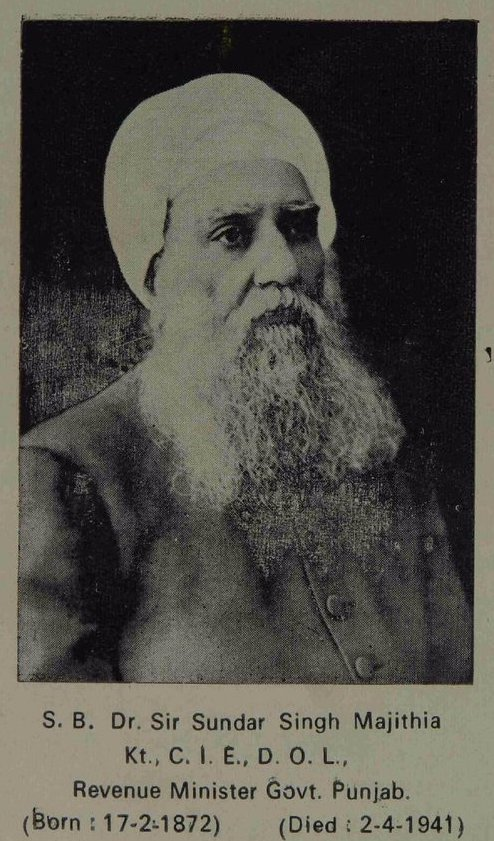
Portrait of Sundar Singh Majithia

Sardar Bahadur Sir Sundar Singh Majithia CIE (17 February 1872 – 2 April 1941) was a Punjabi landowner and politician.

== Biography ==
He was born to an aristocratic Sher-Gill Jat Sikh family, the son of Raja Surat Singh of Majitha. He was educated at Aitchison College, and Government College, in Lahore. In 1909 he established Saraya Sugar Mills in Chauri Chaura, Gorakhpur.

One of the largest landowners in the Punjab, he was also honorary secretary of the Chief Khalsa Diwan, the representative body of the Sikh community in British India, from its formation in 1902 until 1920. He was a supporter of British rule in India, opposed to the activities of the Ghadar Party and served on various bodies appointed by the Viceroy. He was appointed Companion of the Order of the Indian Empire (CIE) in the 1920 New Year Honours and was knighted in 1926.

He served as Revenue Member at the first and second legislative councils of the Punjab Legislative Assembly in 1921 and 1926. Following the Unionist victory in the 1937 Indian provincial elections, Sir Sikandar Hayat Khan promoted him to the cabinet of his new ministry as Revenue Member. He remained in the position until his death in 1941.

He played a leading part in forming the conservative and loyalist Khalsa Nationalist Party and was a significant contributor to the Singh Sabha Movement.

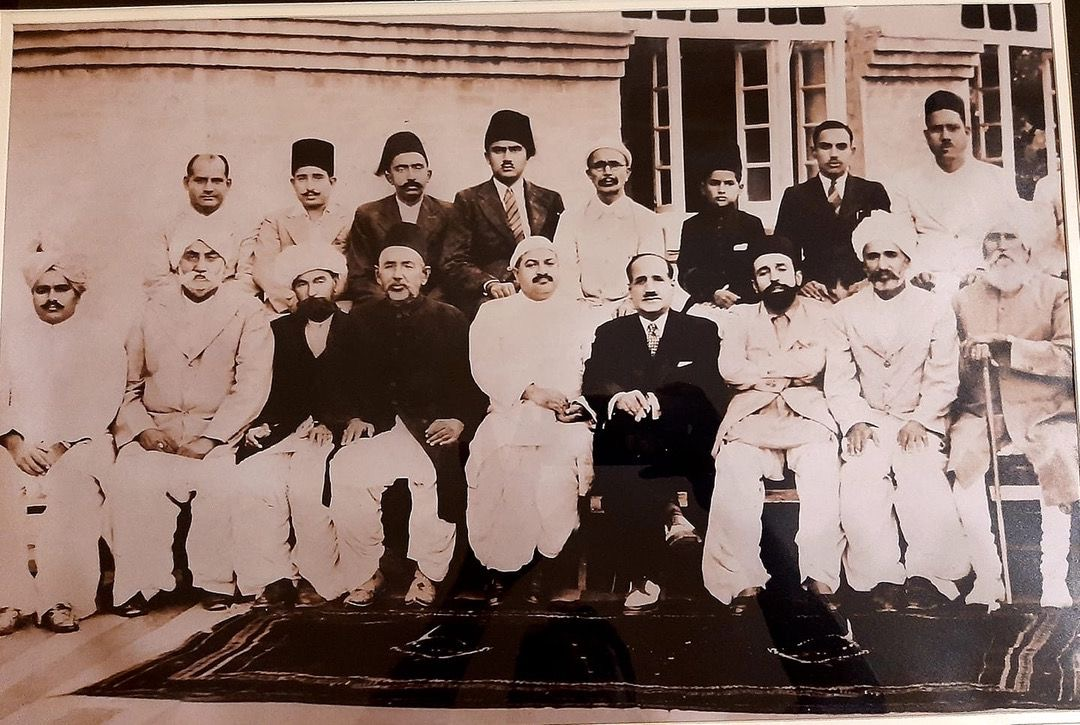
Bottom Row: from right to left Sundar Singh, Haji Wadal Shah, Mir AllahDad Talpur, Unknown, Seth Jhamandas, Ghulam Nabi Shah, Ali Murad Sanjrani, Din Muhammad Junejo, Seth Prem Chand Upper Row: Fourth from left is Ghulam Rasool Shah, rest unknown.

It had been alleged that he hosted a dinner for Reginald Dyer on the evening after the Jallianwala Bagh massacre.

== Personal life ==
Sundar Singh had two sons, one of whom was Surjit Singh Majithia. He was also the great-grandfather of Bikram Singh Majithia and Harsimrat Kaur Badal. His brother was the scholar and photographer Umrao Singh Sher-Gil Majithia and his niece was the artist Amrita Sher-Gil. One of his grandchildren was the aviator Dalip Singh Majithia.

== See also ==
- Majithia Sirdars
