= Yog Joy =

Indian photojournalist

Yog Joy (1938–1996) was an Indian photojournalist whose published works include over 1,000 pictures of news and of human interest themes in international newspapers, periodicals, and books. Born into a humble background in the Sargodha District, he rose to become a prominent figure in Indian press photography. He spent over 20 years with The Tribune, eventually serving as their photo editor.

== Biography ==
Joy came from a rural background. Born in the Sargodha District of Pakistan, he completed his education from Rohtak and pursued photography.

He has been honoured with national and international awards which include the National Press Award; All India Press Photography Competition Award; 'Sakaal' Golden Jubilee National Award for outstanding news photography; The Lalit Kala Akademi's Portfolio Award, UNICEF photo awards on themes of the 'Girl Child' and 'Child needs Peace'; second prize in the UNESCO National Photo competition, second prize in "Fun with Mazda" organized by Mazda for three consecutive years (1985, 1986 and 1987); a medal in the World Photo Contest 1993 organised by UNESCO and ACCU, Japan, and first position in the Kodak Awards for Photographic Excellence in the professional category in 1998.

== Career and notable incidents ==
During his career, Joy was known for his dedicated and risky on-the-ground reporting. In October 1979, while covering a political clash between Akali and Janata Party workers in Chandigarh, he was severely assaulted by the local police for refusing to surrender his camera's film roll, an incident that drew significant attention to press freedom challenges at the time.

In addition to his journalism, he was an executive member of both the Punjab Lalit Kala Akademi and Chandigarh Lalit Kala Akademi, and his work has been featured in posthumous photographic retrospectives across India.

== Exhibitions ==
- A Photographic Retrospective by Yog Joy
- Newspaper Photography Exhibition
