= Prem Bhatia (journalist) =

Indian diplomat and journalist

Prem Narain Bhatia (Lahore, 11 August 1922 – 8 May 1995) was an Indian diplomat and journalist who travelled the world with India's first prime minister, Jawaharlal Nehru. Befriended by Nehru and his successors, notably Lal Bahadur Shastri and Indira Gandhi, he served as political editor of The Statesman (1957–58), editor of The Tribune, Ambala (1959), Delhi editor of The Times of India(1960–62), editor The Indian Express 1963–65, then a diplomat for two decades; He was India's High Commissioner to Kenya 1965–69, and to Singapore 1969–73. Returning to journalism as editor The Tribune, Chandigarh 1977–86.He graduated with a first class degree in English from Government College, Lahore, before giving up a place at Oxford to start his professional career as a reporter on the Civil and Military Gazette newspaper in Lahore.The Prem Bhatia Memorial Trust Award is named in his honour.
