= Dyal Singh Majithia =

Indian banker and activist (1848-1898)

Sardar Dyal Singh Majithia
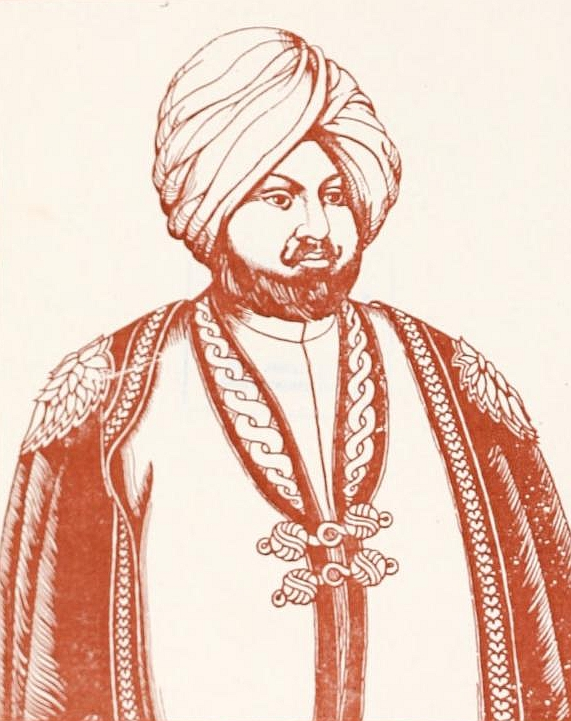
- Born: 1848; Banaras, Banaras State, Company India (now in Uttar Pradesh, India)
- Died: 1898 (aged 49–50); Lahore, Punjab Province, British India (now in Punjab, Pakistan)
- Occupations: Banker; businessman; philanthropist; activist
- Known for: Founding The Tribune and Punjab National Bank
- Spouse: Rani Bhagwan Kaur
- Father: Lehna Singh Majithia
- Family: Majithia

Sardar Dyal Singh Majithia (1848–1898) was an Indian businessman, banker, philanthropist and activist. Majithia established The Tribune, an English language newspaper in Lahore in 1881, and later, he became the founder chairman of the Punjab National Bank, which was established in 1894. Majithia was noted for his wealth, which he had earned through his business interests. His will and trusts donated much of the properties, land holdings and assets he owned to educational institutions.

== Early life and background ==
Majithia was born in Varanasi to Lehna Singh, a former governor of Lahore and member of the Majithia Jat family of Punjab. His grandfather, Desa Singh Majithia, had served Maharaja Ranjit Singh, the Sikh Emperor, as a general and later as the Governor of Mandi and Saket. By the time of Majithia's birth, his family had administered the affairs of the Golden Temple for over 30 years. Majithia was initially educated by a British governess, later attended the Christian Mission School in Amritsar, and independently studied various religions.

== Business career ==
In 1881, Majithia founded the English-language newspaper The Tribune. Majithia also made a considerable fortune through his real estate interests. In his real estate business, he would design and build houses in areas occupied by senior civilians and rent the houses to senior bureaucrats. Through auctions, he would purchase prime real estate for his building projects. Majithia also monitored the prices of houses and land, selling those with poor yields and reinvesting the proceeds from the sales.

Majithia was also a successful trader of jewellery and precious stones. Majithia would leverage his knowledge of Punjab’s ruling families to track and acquire valuable precious stones and jewellery, often through discreet agents, securing them at low prices and reselling them for a profit. His knowledge of jewellery and precious stone was noted by even the professional jewellers in Lahore.

In 1894, Punjab National Bank (PNB) was co-founded by Majithia, who became the Chairman of PNB, Lala Harkishen Lal, an industrialist who became the Secretary of the Board, and other individuals. The first meeting of PNB's board of directors took place in Majithia's house. Initially, 25% of PNB's shareholding was owned by Majithia and he was the chairman of the bank until his death. PNB was the first Indian bank to be founded with capital contributions from Indians and to be owned and managed by Indians.

== Philanthropy and activism ==
Majithia was the first president of the Indian Association of Lahore and held the position until his death. He was a founding member of the Sadharan Brahmo Samaj, a Hindu social reform movement. A prominent member of the Sadharan Brahmo Samaj, Majithia had also financially donated to the organization. Majithia's philanthropy, through his will and trusts, extended to educational institutions and libraries, including Government Dayal Singh College in Lahore, Dyal Singh Memorial Library in Lahore, Dyal Singh College in Delhi, and Dyal Singh College in Karnal. Majithia was also a supporter of the Indian National Congress.

== Personal life ==
Majithia had initially intended to marry a Bengali Brahmo woman; however, this did not take place and Majithia later married Rani Bhagwan Kaur. He had residences in Lahore, Amritsar and Karachi. Majithia died in 1898. Majithia had died issueless and he had bequeathed his ancestral properties to his cousin, who later sold the properties to contest the validity of Majithia's will.

== Legacy ==
The Tribune, is a leading English daily newspaper in Northern India. The Tribune Trust has also published Punjabi Tribune and Dainik Tribune from 1978. Punjab National Bank, which was nationalized in 1969, is one of India's largest banks. After his death, funds from the sale of Majithia's Karachi property were used to buy land where a campus of Punjab University was later established.
