= Surat Singh =

Punjabi Jagirdar (1810–1881)

Raja Sardar Surat Singh
- ਸੂਰਤ ਸਿੰਘ ਮਜੀਠਾ صورت سنگھ مجیٹھا
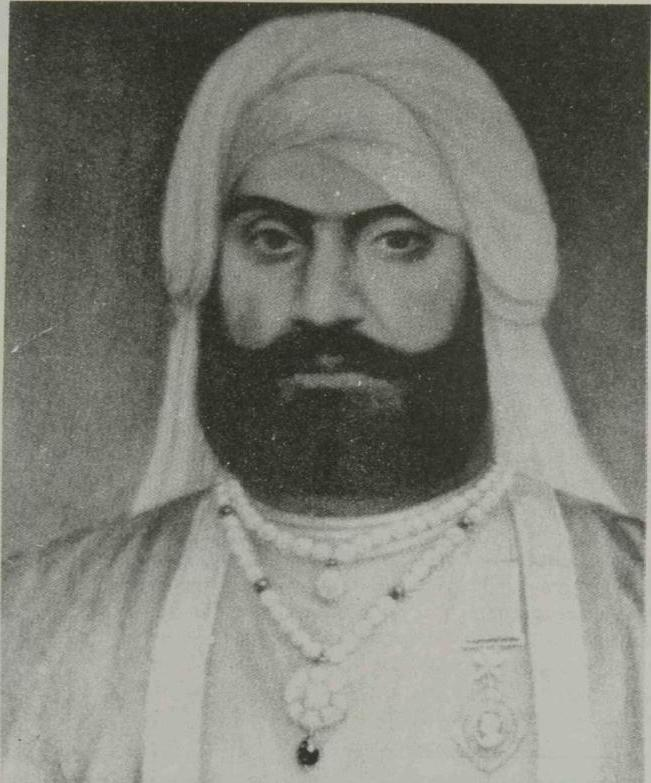
- Portrait of Surat Singh
- Pronunciation: /suːɾət̺ə̆˧ s˧ɪ̀ᵑɡə̆/
- Born: c.1810
- Died: c.1881
- Known for: Member of The Khalsa Phauj
- Parent: Sardar Attar Singh Majitha
- Relatives: 1. Amrita Sher-Gill (granddaughter); 2. Umrao Singh Majitha (son)

Raja Surat Singh CSI (1810–1881) was a Punjabi Jagirdar, a military officer in the Khalsa Army, and a member of the renowned Majithia family.

== Biography ==
He was born in Majitha to Sardar Attar Singh of the Sher-Gill Jat clan. With his father, he participated in many campaigns under Ranjit Singh. In 1843 he succeeded his father. During the First Anglo-Sikh War he was responsible for maintaining order in Naushera.

He was a notable advocate of rebellion prior to the start of the Second Anglo-Sikh War. On Sher Singh leaving Multan, he was placed in command of one division of his army, consisting of two thousand men and two guns. He led a march to Jalalpur which was noted for its excesses, including the defilement of mosques at Chiniot and Jhang, and plundering two lakhs of government money. After the Battle of Gujrat, his jagirs were confiscated and he was banished to Benares on a pension of Rs. 720 per annum.

At the start of the Indian Rebellion of 1857, Surat Singh remained in exile in Banaras. In June 1857 a corps of Ludhiana Sikhs serving in the 37th Regiment of Bengal Native Infantry in Benares was accused of disloyalty and had guns directed at them. This incensed the corps who charged at the guns, suffering many loses. Nearby a Sikh regiment was guarding the Benares treasury, and on hearing the treatment of the Ludhiana Sikhs, threatened to mutiny. Surat Singh visited the regiment and using his personal influence discouraged them from rebelling. Later in the rebellion he commanded troops on various occasions in the field, and on 6 July was wounded by a sabre to the thigh by a body of Rajputs who had attacked Benares.

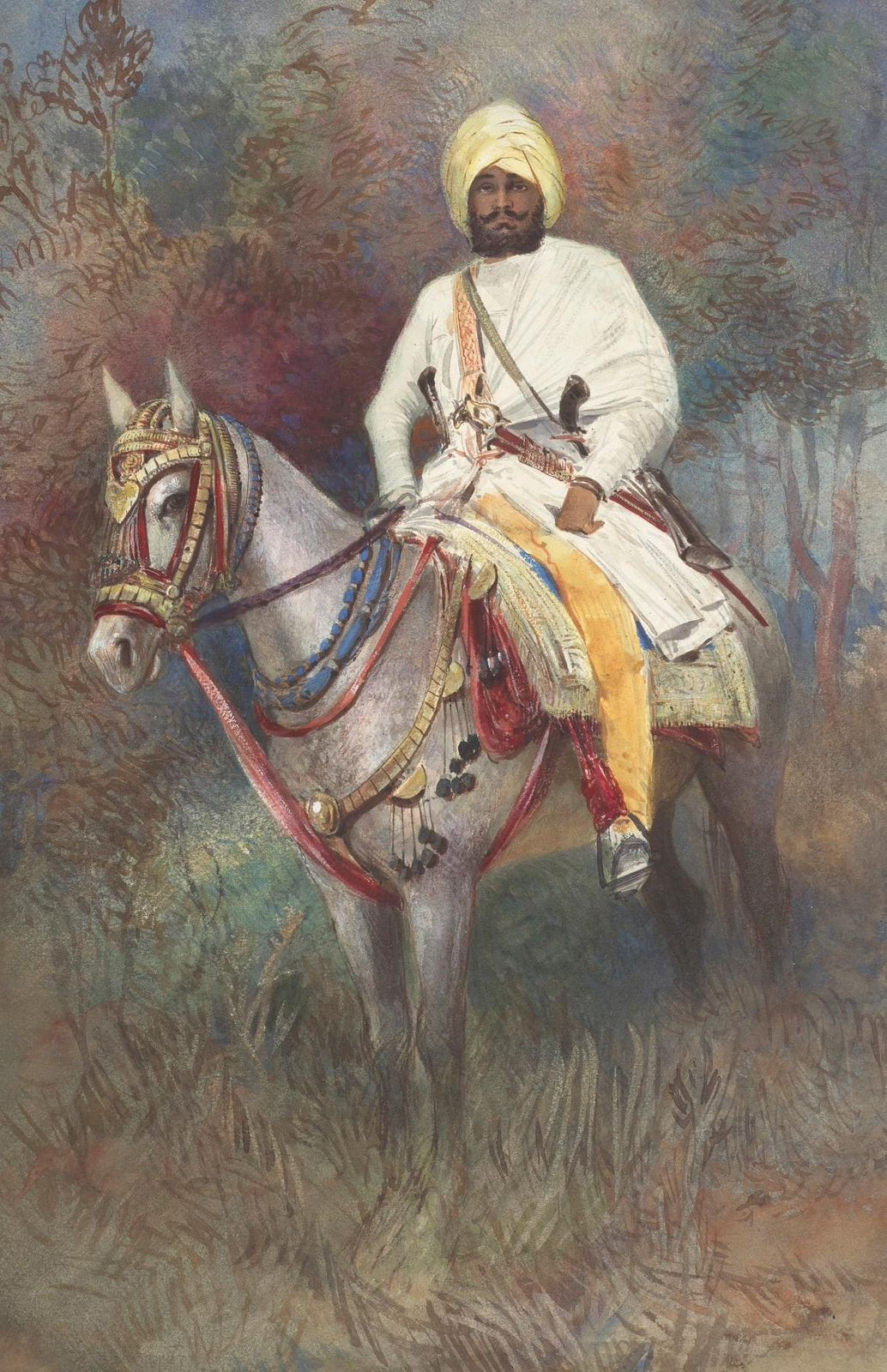
Equestrian painting of Surat Singh of Majithia, Benares, 1859

For his services in 1857, he was awarded a pension of Rs. 4,800 per annum, and awarded a jagir in perpetuity in Dumri, Gorakhpur. He was also allowed to return to the Punjab. In 1875 he was made an Honorary Magistrate and granted civil-judicial powers in Majithia. In 1877 he was awarded the title of Raja and made a Companion of the Star of India.

He died in 1881 and was succeeded by his eldest son Umrao Singh Sher-Gil. His granddaughter through Umrao Singh was the artist Amrita Sher-Gil. His younger son Sundar Singh Majithia became a prominent politician in the Punjab.
