= Dalip Singh Majithia =

Indian Air Force pilot (1920–2024)

Dalip Singh Majitha
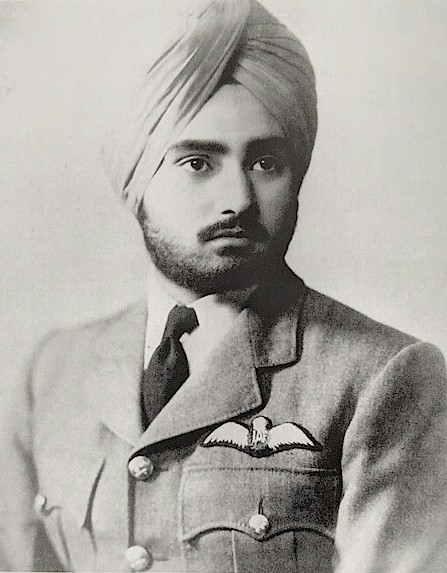
- In office 1940–1947

Personal details
- Born: 27 July 1920
- Died: 16 April 2024 (aged 103)

Military service
- Battles/wars: World War II

Dalip Singh Majithia (27 July 1920 – 16 April 2024) was an Indian Air Force pilot. He primarily served during the Second World War during which, however, he did not see much active service on account of a long bout of illness during his only posting in the conflict-zone, in Myanmar from 1944. At the time of his death on 16 April 2024, he was the oldest living pilot of the Indian Air Force at the age of 103.

== Early life and education ==
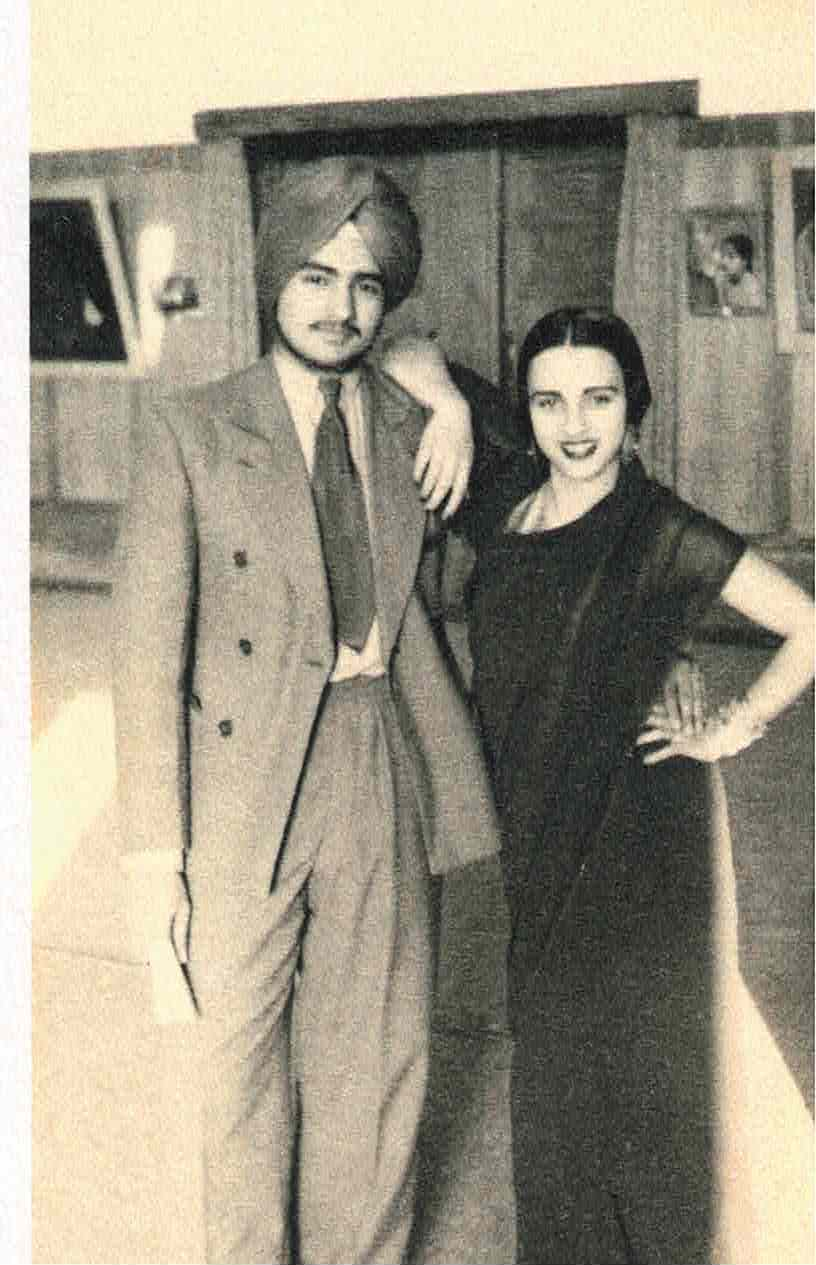
Painter Amrita Sher-Gil and Dalip Singh Majithia, 1937, Lahore

Dalip Singh Majithia was born on 27 July 1930 in Shimla, now in Himachal Pradesh, India, the youngest son of Kirpal Singh (1891–1944) and his wife Raminder Kaur (1894–1936). His grandfather was Sundar Singh Majithia, making him first cousin once removed of the artist Amrita Sher-Gil. In childhood, he was affectionately referred to as "Dipi", or collectively with his brother as "the boys". In the 1920s, both Singh and Sher-Gil grew up in the family home, Majithia House.

Majithia studied at Khalsa College in Amritsar, and later at Lahore, where he completed his Bachelor of Arts degree.

== Career ==
Majithia learned the basics of flying at the Karachi Flying Club on a Gypsy Moth aircraft. In 1940, he joined the IAF volunteer reserve in 1940 during the Second World War. On 1 August 1940, he joined the 4th Pilot's Course at the Initial Training School (ITA) at Walton Cantonment in Lahore, where after three months, he won the best pilot trophy. To continue his advanced training, he was posted to the No.1 Flying Training School in Ambala.

In March 1943, he joined the Number 6 Squadron under the command of 'Baba' Mehar Singh as a flying officer. In January 1944, he was posted in Kohat as the Flight Commander of Number 3 Squadron and flew Hurricane aircraft. Later, he was posted in Burma (now Myanmar) as the Flight Commander of No. 4 Squadron. A long bout of illness kept him out of active flying for sometime. When he fell in February 1945, his former squadron mate, Flight Lieutenant Asghar Khan, flew him to a hospital in Calcutta in a Harvard aircraft. After that, he served at the Air Headquarters. Later he served as the IAF's Liaison Officer to the Joint Chiefs of Staff in Melbourne, Australia.

On 18 March 1947, he retired from the Indian Air Force. After that, he flew as a private pilot. In 1949, he made history by being the first to land a plane in the Kathmandu Valley. He conducted the landing of an aircraft in Kathmandu, Nepal on an unprepared piece of land. That site is now the site of the Nepal's international airport. Through his career, he had more than 1,100 flying hours to his name, including on aircraft like Hurricanes and Spitfires. By his fellow pilots, he was affectionately called 'Maji'. He flew for the last time in January 1979.

== Later life ==
After retirement from the Air Force, he settled at his family's estate in Sardarnagar, near Gorakhpur in Uttar Pradesh. He also ran a successful business venture. In March 2021, 100 year old Dalip Singh and his 99 year old wife Joan Sanders Majithia received their first doses of a COVID-19 vaccine at Sunrise Hospital in Gurugram, along with their 72-year-old daughter Kiran Sandhu and three other family friends in their 70s.

== Personal life ==
On 18 February 1947, Dalip Singh married Joan Sanders at his family's estate in Gorakhpur, whom he had met during his service in Melbourne, Australia. She was in the Women's Royal Australian Naval Service as a code breaker during the war, working in the Fleet Radio Unit, Melbourne. The couple had two daughters, named Kiran and Mira.

== See also ==
- Majithia family
- Royal Indian Air Force
- India in World War II
- Indian Army during World War II

== Bibliography ==
- Sundaram, Vivan (2010a). Amrita Sher-Gil: A Self-Portrait in Letters and Writings. Vol. 1. New Delhi: Tulika Books. pp. 1–417. ISBN 978-81-89487-59-1.
- Sundaram, Vivan (2010b). Amrita Sher-Gil: A Self-Portrait in Letters and Writings. Vol. 2. New Delhi: Tulika Books. pp. 418–821. ISBN 978-81-89487-59-1.
