= The Tribune (India) =

Indian English-language daily newspaper

- Voice of the People

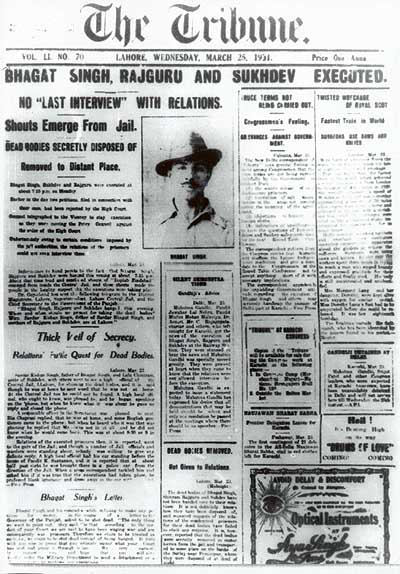
- Front page, 1931
- Type: Daily newspaper
- Format: Broadsheet
- Owner: The Tribune Trust
- Founder: Dyal Singh Majithia
- Publisher: The Tribune Trust
- Editor-in-chief: Jyoti Malhotra
- Founded: 2 February 1881; 145 years ago
- Political alignment: Centre-left politics
- Language: English
- Headquarters: 29-C, Chandigarh, India (previously Ambala)
- Country: India
- Circulation: 1826000+ (as of May 2020)
- Price: ₹5 (5.2¢ US) (weekdays); ₹7 (7.3¢ US) (weekends)
- Sister newspapers: Dainik Tribune; Punjabi Tribune
- ISSN: 0971-989X
- OCLC number: 36205400
- Website: tribuneindia.com

The Tribune is an Indian English-language daily newspaper published from Chandigarh and printed at Chandigarh, Jalandhar, Bathinda, and Gurugram. It was founded on 2 February 1881, in Lahore, Punjab (now in Pakistan), by Sardar Dyal Singh Majithia, a philanthropist, and is run by a trust comprising five persons as trustees. It is a major Indian newspaper with a worldwide circulation. In India, it is among the leading English daily for Punjab, Haryana, Himachal Pradesh, and the Union Territory of Chandigarh.

== Overview ==
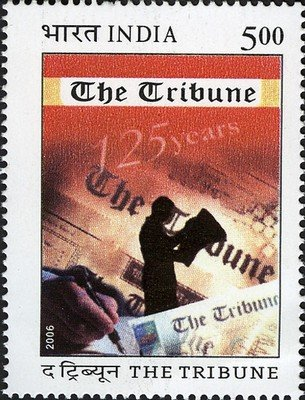
India Post stamp commemorating 125 years of The Tribune, 2006

The Tribune is published in English language along with two sister publications: Dainik Tribune (in Hindi) and Punjabi Tribune (in Punjabi). All three newspapers are published by The Tribune Trust. Narinder Nath Vohra is the current president of The Tribune Trust, which comprises S. S. Sodhi, S. S. Mehta, Gurbachan Jagat, and Paramjit Singh Patwalia as trustees.

The present Editor-in-Chief of The Tribune is Jyoti Malhotra. Naresh Kaushal is the editor of Dainik Tribune and Arvinder Kaur Johal is the editor of the Punjabi Tribune. The Tribune has had Kali Nath Roy, Prem Bhatia, Hari Jai Singh, H.K. Dua, Raj Chengappa, and Harish Khare among others, as its editors-in-chief in the past.

The online edition of The Tribune was launched in July 1998, and the online editions of the Punjabi Tribune and Dainik Tribune were launched on 16 August 2010.

Similar to most Indian newspapers, The Tribune receives most of its revenue from advertisements over subscriptions.

== See also ==
- Yog Joy, an Indian photojournalist
