= Surjit Singh Majithia =

Indian politician, diplomat and air force officer

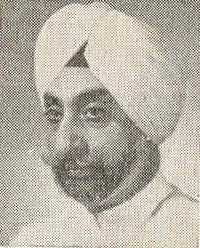

Member of Parliament, Lok Sabha
- In office 1952-1967
- Succeeded by: Gurdial Singh Dhillon
- Constituency: Tarn Taran Punjab

Union Minister of state for Defence
- In office 1952—1962

9th President of BCCI
- In office 1956–1958
- Preceded by: Maharajkumar of Vizianagram
- Succeeded by: R. K. Patel

Personal details
- Born: 8 August 1912 Shimla, Punjab, British India
- Died: 27 September 1995 (aged 83) Delhi, India
- Party: Indian National Congress
- Spouse: Kushalpal Kaur
- Children: 3 sons
- Parent: Sundar Singh Majithia (father)
- Relatives: Harsimrat Kaur Badal (granddaughter); Bikram Singh Majithia (grandson); Majithia Sirdars
- Military career
- Allegiance: British India; India
- Branch: Indian Air Force
- Service years: 1939–1944
- Rank: Wing Commander
- Conflicts: Second World War

Surjit Singh Majithia (1912-1995) was an Indian politician, diplomat and air force officer. He was elected to the Lok Sabha, the lower house of the Parliament of India from the Tarn Taran constituency of Punjab as a member of the Indian National Congress.

== Biography ==
Majithia was born into the prominent Sher-Gill Jatt Sikh landholding Majithia family. His father was Sundar Singh Majithia who served in the Punjab government.

Majithia was commissioned a pilot officer in the flying branch of the Indian Air Force Volunteer Reserve on 8 November 1939, two months after the start of the Second World War. He rose to command a fighter squadron until he left the Air Force in 1944 to pursue a political career. From 1945 to 1947, he was member of Central Legislative Assembly, served on the Defence Consultative Committee and was principal of Khalsa College, Amritsar. After independence in 1947, he was promoted to honorary wing commander in the (Royal) Indian Air Force and appointed ambassador to the neighbouring country of Nepal, where he remained until 1949.

He served as the President of Board of Control for Cricket in India, All India Tennis Association, Yachting Association of India and Wrestling Federation of India; Vice-president of National Rifle Association of India.

== See also ==
- Majithia Sirdars
