= Amar Singh Majithia =

Governor of Hazara
- In office 1820–1822
- Monarch: Ranjit Singh
- Preceded by: Diwan Ram Dayal
- Succeeded by: Hari Singh Nalwa

Personal details
- Died: 1822 Hazara, Sikh Empire

Amar Singh Majithia was the governor of Hazara region in the Sikh Empire from 1820 until his death in 1822.

== Biography ==
He was also called Amar Singh Kallan (senior) to distinguish him from Amar Singh Khurd (junior). Both Amar Singh Kallan and Khurd were from the village of Majitha. Amar Singh Majithia took part in many early campaigns under Ranjit Singh and was appointed governor of Hazara Division after Diwal Ram Dial's death by the Mashwani and Utmanzai tribesmen of Hazara. He was known to be an astute person and succeeded in winning over the leading men to his side, and in collecting the old Durani revenue and tribute from the Hazara plains. However, like his predecessor, Amar Singh Majithia was also killed in battle along with all of his men by the Karlal tribe. The scene of this battle was at the banks of Samundar katha stream, a tributary of the Harroh river.
