= Dainik Tribune =

Indian newspaper

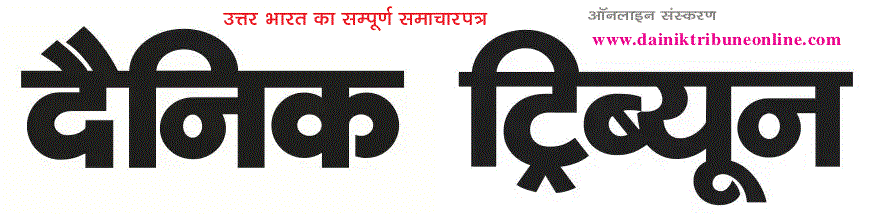

- Front page of Dainik Tribune on 22 May 2013 of Haryana edition.
- Type: Daily newspaper
- Format: Broadsheet
- Owner: The Tribune Trust
- Editor: Naresh Kaushal
- Founded: 15 August 1978
- Political alignment: Neutral
- Language: Hindi
- Sister newspapers: The Tribune; Punjabi Tribune
- Website: dainiktribuneonline.com
- Free online archives: Yes

Dainik Tribune (Hindi: दैनिक ट्रिब्यून, romanized: Dainika Ṭribyūna, lit. 'The Daily Tribune') is an Indian Hindi-language daily newspaper that is being currently published from Chandigarh, New Delhi, Jalandhar and Bathinda. It was first established in 1978 by The Tribune Trust, which published The Tribune and the Punjabi Tribune. Jyoti Malhotra is the Editor-in-Chief of The Tribune Group of Newspapers. Naresh Kaushal is the Editor of Dainik Tribune. The Internet editions of the Dainik Tribune were launched on 16 August 2010.

== See also ==
- Punjabi Tribune
- The Tribune
