= Ganieve Kaur Majithia =

Indian politician

Member of the Punjab Legislative Assembly
- Incumbent
- Assumed office 10 March 2022
- Preceded by: Bikram Singh Majithia
- Constituency: Majitha

Personal details
- Born: Ganieve Grewal; 1975 or 1976 (age 50–51)
- Party: Shiromani Akali Dal
- Spouse: Bikram Singh Majithia (m. 2009)
- Children: 2
- Education: Jesus and Mary College, 1996
- Profession: Businessperson, agriculturalist

Ganieve Kaur Majithia (born Ganieve Grewal) is an Indian politician and a member of 16th Punjab Legislative Assembly representing Majitha. She is a member of the Shiromani Akali Dal.

== Personal life ==
Born as Ganieve Grewal, Majithia graduated from Jesus and Mary College, University of Delhi in 1996. She married politician Bikram Singh Majithia in November 2009, with whom she has two sons. She is a businessperson and agriculturalist by profession.

== Political career ==
Majithia entered into politics in the 2022 Punjab Legislative Assembly election, as a successor of her husband from the Majitha constituency. She went on to defeat Aam Aadmi Party's Sukhjinder Singh Lalli Majithia by 26062 votes.
