= Majitha Assembly constituency =

Legislative Assembly constituency in Punjab State, India

Coordinates: 31.76°N 74.96°E

Majitha
- Constituency No. 13 for the Punjab Legislative Assembly

Constituency details
- Country: India
- State: Punjab
- District: Amritsar
- Lok Sabha constituency: Amritsar
- Total electors: 167,775
- Reservation: None

Member of Legislative Assembly
- 16th Punjab Legislative Assembly
- Incumbent Ganieve Kaur Majithia
- Party: SAD
- Elected year: 2022

Majitha Assembly constituency (Sl. No.: 13) is a Punjab Legislative Assembly constituency in Amritsar district, Punjab state, India. VVPAT was used in Majitha in the 2017 Assembly polls.

== Members of the Legislative Assembly ==
Most successful parties from Majitha Vidhan Sabha
1. SAD (9 Times) (56.2%)
2. INC (7 Times) (43.8%)

Year	Name	Party
1957	Parkash Kaur	Indian National Congress
1962	Parkash Kaur	Indian National Congress
1967	Parkash Singh Majitha	Shiromani Akali Dal
1969	Shashpal Singh	Shiromani Akali Dal
1972	Kirpal Singh Kathunangal	Indian National Congress
1977	Parkash Singh Majitha	Shiromani Akali Dal
1980	Parkash Singh Majitha	Shiromani Akali Dal
1985	Surindarpal Singh	Indian National Congress
1992	Ranjit Singh	Indian National Congress
1997	Parkash Singh Majitha	Shiromani Akali Dal
2001^	Raj Mohinder Singh Majitha	Shiromani Akali Dal
2002	Swinder Singh Kathunangal	Indian National Congress
2007	Bikram Singh Majithia	Shiromani Akali Dal
2012	Bikram Singh Majithia	Shiromani Akali Dal
2017	Bikram Singh Majithia	Shiromani Akali Dal
2022	Ganieve Kaur Majithia	Shiromani Akali Dal

^ = (By-elections)

== Election results ==
=== 2027 ===
Punjab Assembly election, 2027: Majitha
Party	Candidate	Votes	%	±%
SAD	Bikram Singh Majithia			
AAP	Talbir Singh Gill			
INC	Kauravdeep Singh Kathunangal			
AD (WPD)	Papalpreet Singh			New entry
BSP				
SAD(A)				
BJP				
NOTA	None of the above			
Majority				
Turnout				
Registered electors		167,775		
hold				

=== 2022 ===
Punjab Assembly election, 2022: Majitha
Party	Candidate	Votes	%	±%
SAD	Ganieve Kaur Majithia	57,027	47.0	
AAP	Sukhjinder Raj Singh (Lalli Majithia)	30,965	25.50	
INC	Jagwinder Pal Singh (Jagga Majithia)	26,008	21.40	
SAD(A)	Kulwant Singh Kotla Gujran	3,553	2.91	
BJP	Pardeep Singh	1,654	1.40	
NOTA	None of the above	811	0.5	
Majority		26,062	21.3	
Turnout		122,152	72.8	
Registered electors		167,775		
SAD hold				

=== 2017 ===
Punjab Assembly election, 2017: Majitha
Party	Candidate	Votes	%	±%
SAD	Bikram Singh Majithia	65,803	53.70	
INC	Sukhjinder Raj Singh (Lalli Majithia)	42,919	35.0	
AAP	Himmat Singh Shergill	10,252	8.43	
BSP	Surjit Singh	700	0.58	
SAD(A)	Kulwant Singh	657	0.54	
NOTA	None of the above	924	0.6	
Majority		22,884	21.34	
Turnout		121,684	77.1	
Registered electors		158,951		

=== 2012 ===
Punjab Assembly election, 2012: Majitha
Party	Candidate	Votes	%	±%
SAD	Bikram Singh Majithia	73,944	64.10	
Independent	Sukhjinder Raj Singh (Lalli Majithia)	26,363	22.80	
INC	Shalinderjit Singh Shelly	7,629	6.6	
Communist Party Of India	Balwinder Singh	2,270	2.0	
Majority		47,581	41.3	
Turnout		115,215	81.8	
Registered electors		140,788		
