= Bikram Singh Majithia =

Indian politician

Bikramjit Singh Majithia
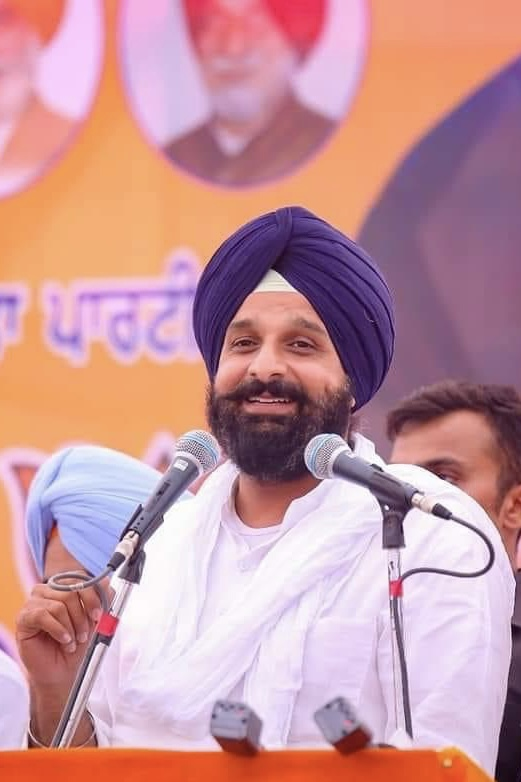
- Majithia at a rally in 2021

Member of the Punjab Legislative Assembly
- In office 2007–2022
- Preceded by: Swinder Singh
- Succeeded by: Ganieve Kaur Majithia
- Constituency: Majitha

Minister for Information & Public Relations

Minister for Environment & Non- Conventional Energy
- In office 2007 – 2017
- Chief Minister: Parkash Singh Badal
- Preceded by: Capt. Amarinder Singh

Minister for Water Supply & Sanitation
- In office 2007 – 2012
- Chief Minister: Parkash Singh Badal
- Preceded by: Capt. Amarinder Singh
- Succeeded by: Jagir Kaur

Minister for Science Technology
- In office 2007 – 2012
- Chief Minister: Parkash Singh Badal
- Preceded by: Rakesh Pandey
- Succeeded by: Parkash Singh Badal

Minister for Revenue & Rehabilitation
- In office 2012 – 2017
- Chief Minister: Parkash Singh Badal
- Preceded by: Ajit Singh Kohar

Minister for NRI Affairs
- In office 2012 – 2017
- Chief Minister: Parkash Singh Badal
- Preceded by: Parkash Singh Badal

Personal details
- Born: 1 March 1975 (age 51)
- Party: Shiromani Akali Dal
- Spouse: Ganieve Kaur Majithia (m. 2009)
- Children: 2
- Relatives: Sardar Surjit Singh Majithia (grandfather); Harsimrat Kaur Badal (sister); Majithia Sirdars

Bikram Singh Majithia (born 1 March 1975) is an Indian politician and a former cabinet minister in the Punjab Government. He won 2007 Punjab Vidhan Sabha elections from the Majitha constituency, and again won in 2012 and 2017. He belongs to Shiromani Akali Dal and was president of its Youth Wing, Youth Akali Dal.

== Background and family ==
Majithia was born on 1 March 1975 to former Deputy Defence Minister Satyajit Singh Majithia and Sukhmanjus Kaur Majithia in Delhi. He was educated at the Lawrence School Sanawar. His grandfather Sardar Surjit Singh Majithia was a Wing Commander in the Indian Air Force and his great-grandfather Sir Sundar Singh Majithia was Revenue Minister in the Punjab government. He is the younger brother of Bathinda MP, Harsimrat Kaur Badal and brother-in-law of former Deputy Chief Minister of Punjab, Sukhbir Singh Badal. Bikram married Ganieve Kaur in November 2009 and they have two sons.

== Political career ==
He first won the Punjab Vidhan Sabha elections from the Majitha constituency in 2007. He won again from the same constituency in 2012 and 2017 assembly elections. Subsequently he was inducted into the Punjab Cabinet. He is ex minister of Revenue, Rehabilitation and Disaster Management, Information & Public Relations and Non Conventional Energy.

== Drugs and corruption charges ==
=== Narcotic Drugs and Psychotropic Substances (NDPS) ===
In December 2021, the Punjab Police registered a First Information Report (FIR) against Majithia under the Narcotic Drugs and Psychotropic Substances (NDPS) Act. The case alleges his involvement in a drug trafficking network operating within the state. In February 2022, Majithia surrendered before a Mohali court in the drug case registered against him in December 2021, and was remanded in judicial custody till 8 March. While his wife Ganieve contested from Majitha constituency in the 2022 Punjab Legislative Assembly election and won, Majithia instead contested from Amritsar East, and lost.

He was imprisoned in Patiala Jail along with his rival Congress leader Navjot Singh Sidhu against whom Majithia contested the 2022 Punjab Assembly elections.

On 10 August 2022, the Punjab and Haryana High Court granted bail to Majithia. The Punjab government later challenged this decision. Subsequently, the Supreme Court directed Majithia to appear before the Special Investigation Team (SIT) for questioning in March 2025.

Following the Supreme Court's directive, Majithia was summoned by the SIT on 17 March 2025. He appeared before the team in Patiala, where he was questioned for over seven hours regarding his alleged involvement in the drug trafficking case.

On 18 March 2025, Majithia was called in for additional questioning by the SIT. The investigation has expanded to examine financial transactions linked to firms associated with him, with authorities scrutinising suspicious financial activities that may be connected to the drug trade.

=== Disproportionate assets charges ===
He is facing serious corruption charges related to a disproportionate assets (DA) case. On 25 June 2025, he was arrested by the Punjab Vigilance Bureau in connection with a disproportionate assets case.

In August 2025, the Vigilance Bureau filed a comprehensive 40,000-page chargesheet against Majithia in a Mohali court. The chargesheet cites over 200 witnesses and includes evidence of financial discrepancies and illicit wealth amassed during his tenure as a minister.

The case alleges that Majithia laundered over ₹540 crore in drug money, funnelling illicit funds into his controlled companies and routing them through foreign entities. The funds were reportedly deposited in multiple bank accounts, with evidence of hawala transactions, mobile phones, and laptops seized during the investigation.

== See also ==
- Majithia family
