= Majithia family =

Family of Shergill sadars

Dilapidated haveli belonging to Majithia family in Majithia, Amritsar district, Punjab, India

The Majithia family are a family of Shergill Jat sardars that derive their name from the village of Majitha, in Amritsar District, Punjab. The Majithias were a prominent family in the court of the Sikh Empire, serving as administrators and military generals.

Some members of the family continue to play a role in Indian politics, such as Bikram Singh Majithia, who served as a cabinet minister in the Punjab government.

== History ==
The family is divided into three principle branches, the Dayal Singh branch, Surat Singh branch, and Mahtab Singh branch. Dayal Singh and Matab Singh were fifth cousins, whilst Surat Singh was considerably more distantly related to them. One had to go back fourteen generations from their generation to find a common relation between Surat Singh and the other two branches. An early ancestor of the family was Madho, a Jat of the Gill clan, which the Sher-Gill clan is a derivative of. He founded the village of Madho-Jetha, later known as Majitha. Lepel H. Griffin in his work, Panjab Chiefs (1865), states that the Majithia family is the progeny of a certain Rana Dhar, who was the son of Sher-Gil (founder of the clan).

== Notable Members ==
Below is a list of prominent members of the Majithia family.

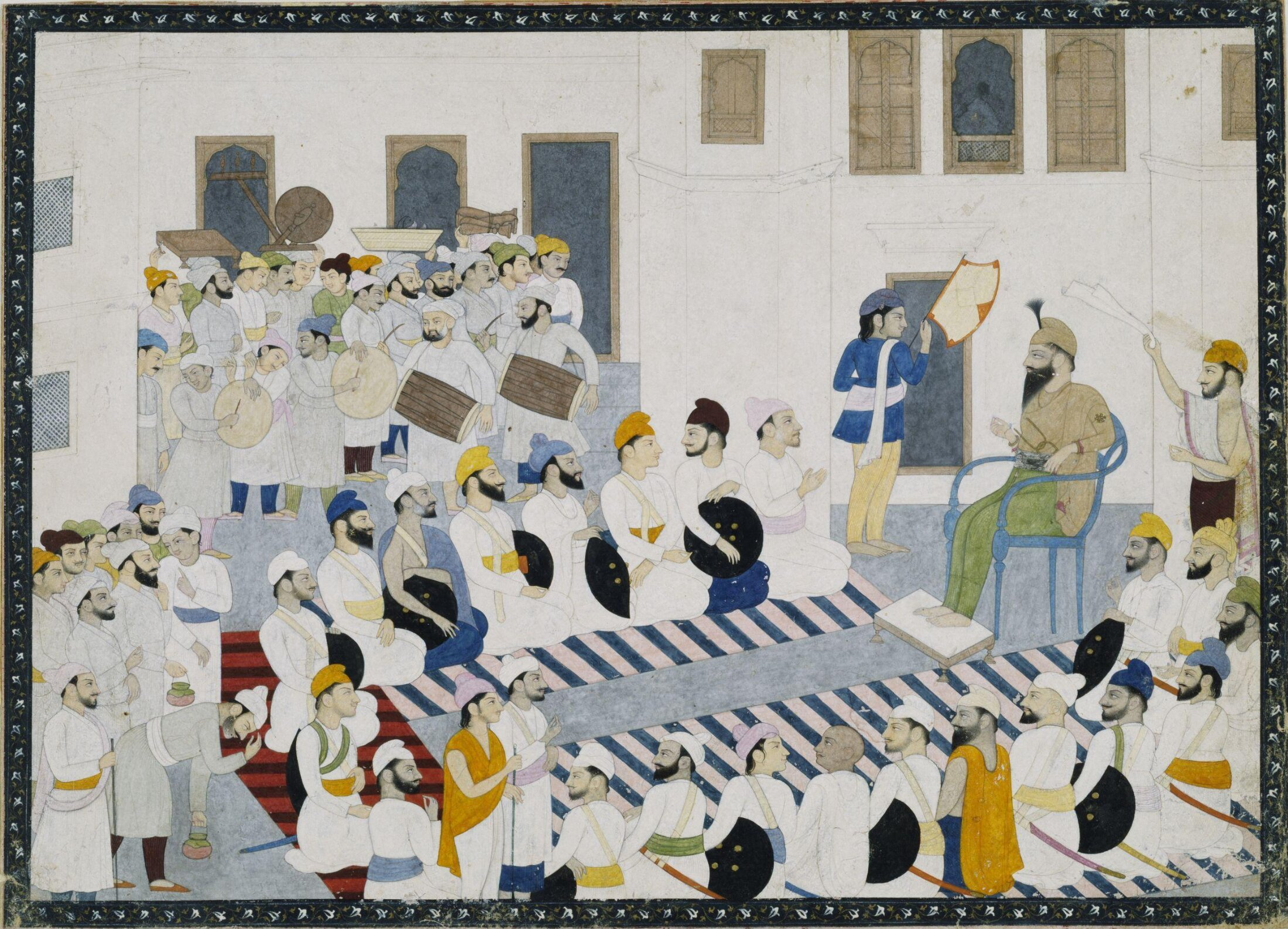
Painting of Desa Singh Majithia receiving a deputation from a State court in the Punjab Hills, ca.1775

=== Dayal Singh branch ===
- Desa Singh (1768–1832)
- Lehna Singh (d. 1854)
- Ranjodh Singh (d. 1872)
- Dyal Singh (1848–1898)

=== Surat Singh branch ===
- Surat Singh (1810–1881), zamindar and military officer in the Khalsa Army In 1877, he was awarded the title of Raja and made a Companion of the Star of India.
- Sundar Singh Majithia (1872–1941), landowner and politician. He was a member of Khalsa Nationalist Party and Revenue Member at the first and second legislative councils of the Punjab Legislative Assembly. The first president of the Shiromani Gurdwara Parbandhak Committee
- Umrao Singh Sher-Gil (1870–1954) aristocrat and a scholar in Sanskrit and Persian and Father of Amrita Sher-Gil
- Amrita Sher-Gil (1913–1941, through her father, Umrao Singh Sher-Gil), Hungarian-Indian painter. Daughter of Umrao Singh
- Wing Commander Surjit Singh Majithia (1912–1995), Indian politician, diplomat, and air force officer. Son of Sundar Singh Majithia
- Satyajit Singh Majithia, educationist, industrialist, philanthropist, and Chancellor of Khalsa University. Son of Sardar Surjit Singh Majithia, former Deputy Defence Minister
- Harsimrat Kaur Badal, a former Union Cabinet Minister of Food Processing Industries. Daughter of Satyajit Singh Majithia
- Bikram Singh Majithia, a former cabinet minister in the Punjab Government. Son of Satyajit Singh Majithia
- Jimmy Shergill (born Jasjit Singh Gill; 3 December 1970), also known as Jimmy Shergill, is an Indian actor and producer who primarily works in Hindi and Punjabi films

=== Mahtab Singh branch ===
- Mahtab Singh (1811–1865)

== Pedigrees ==
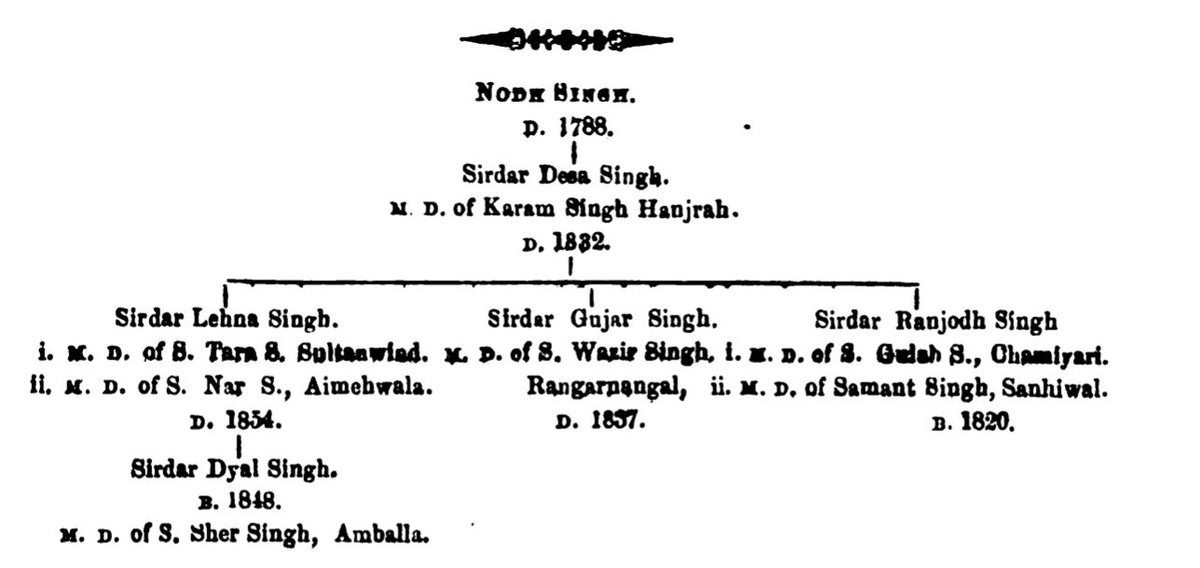
Pedigree for Dayal Singh branch of Majithias

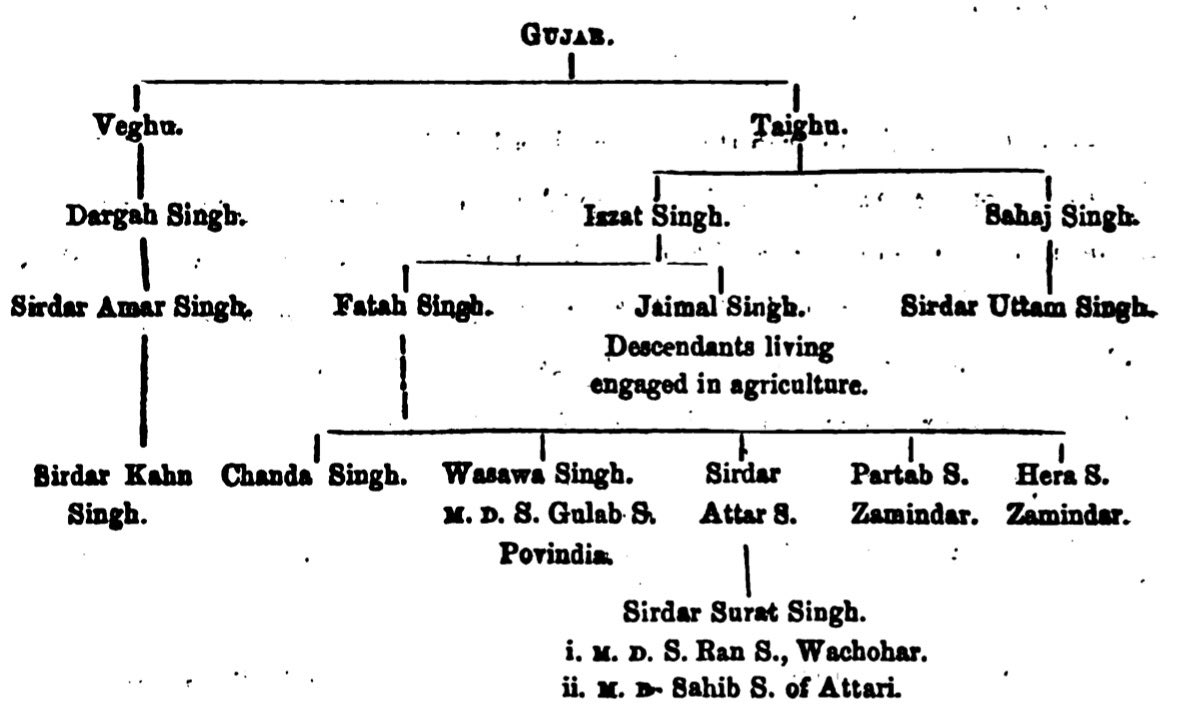
Pedigree for Surat Singh branch of Majithias
