= Shergill =

- Jat clan
- Ethnicity: Punjabi
- Descended from: Shergill
- Parent tribe: Gill
- Branches: Majithia
- Language: Punjabi
- Religion: Sikhism
- Surnames: Shergill, Sher-Gill, Sher-Gil, Majithia

Shergill is a surname and clan of Jats, descending from the parent clan Gill. According to oral history, the founding progenitor of the clan was a man named Shergill, who was the son of Gill. The Majithia family belong to this clan.

The ruling house of the Nishanwalia Misl during the Sikh Confederacy was from this clan.

== List of notable people ==
Notable people bearing the name Shergill (or Sher-Gill), and who may or may not be related to the clan, include:

- Avneet Shergill, US soccer player
- Amrita Sher-Gil, Indian painter
- Daljit Singh Shergill, UK Sikh leader
- Dyal Singh Majithia founder of The Tribune and Punjab National Bank
- Jaiveer Shergill, Indian politician and lawyer
- Jimmy Shergill, Indian actor and producer
- Lehna Singh Majithia, Sikh polymath and father of Dyal Singh
- Rabbi Shergill, Indian musician
- Rubina Shergill, Indian actress

== See also ==
- Gill (name)
- Gil (disambiguation)
