= Punjabi Tribune =

Indian newspaper

- Front page of the Thursday, 24th of August, 2023 edition of the Punjabi Tribune
- Type: Daily newspaper
- Format: Broadsheet
- Owner: The Tribune Trust
- Editor: Swaraj Bir Singh
- Founded: 15 August 1978
- Political alignment: Neutral
- Language: Punjabi
- Headquarters: Chandigarh, Punjab, India
- Circulation: Punjab, Haryana
- Website: PunjabiTribuneOnline.com

Punjabi Tribune is a Punjabi-language daily newspaper owned by The Tribune Trust, published in the Punjab, India. It was launched on 15 August 1978 and became online on the internet in August 2010. Jyoti Malhotra is the editor-in-chief of The Tribune Group of Newspapers. Arvinder Pal Kaur is the officiating editor of Punjabi Tribune.

== See also ==
- The Tribune
- Khalsa Akhbar Lahore
- List of newspapers
- List of newspapers in India by circulation
- List of newspapers in the world by circulation
