= Harsimrat Kaur Badal =

Indian politician (born 1966)

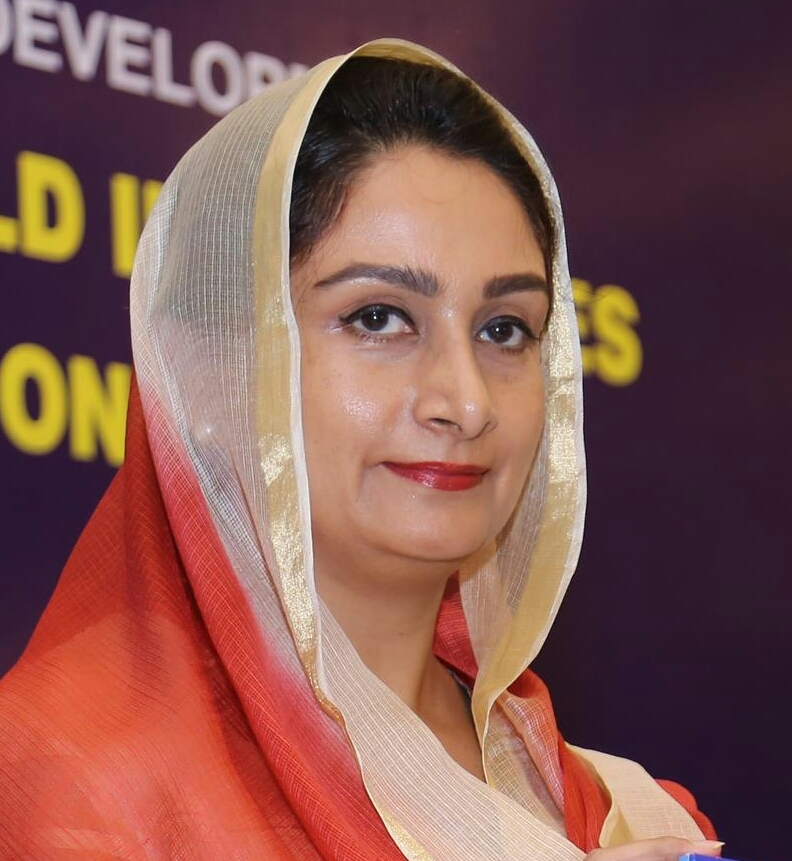

Member of Parliament, Lok Sabha
- Incumbent
- Assumed office 13 May 2009
- Preceded by: Paramjit Kaur Gulshan
- Constituency: Bathinda, Punjab

Union Minister of Food Processing Industries
- In office 26 May 2014 – 17 September 2020
- Prime Minister: Narendra Modi
- Preceded by: Krishna Tirath
- Succeeded by: Narendra Singh Tomar

Personal details
- Born: 25 July 1966 (age 60) New Delhi, Delhi, India
- Party: Shiromani Akali Dal
- Other political affiliations: National Democratic Alliance (1998-2020)
- Spouse: Sukhbir Singh Badal (m. 1991)
- Children: 3
- Relatives: Parkash Singh Badal (father-in-law); Bikram Singh Majithia (brother); Sardar Surjit Singh Majithia (grandfather); Majithia Sirdars
- Profession: Politician
- Website: harsimratkaurbadal.online

Harsimrat Kaur Badal (born 25 July 1966) is an Indian politician and a former Union Cabinet Minister of Food Processing Industries in the Government of India and Member of Parliament in the Lok Sabha from Bathinda. She is a member of Shiromani Akali Dal Party. Her husband Sukhbir Singh Badal is former deputy chief minister of Punjab and the president of Shiromani Akali Dal. She resigned from the cabinet on 17 September 2020 to protest against few farmer related ordinances and legislation.

== Personal life ==
Badal was born on 25 July 1966 to Satyajit Singh Majithia and Sukhmanjus Majithia in Delhi. She did her schooling from Loreto Convent School, Delhi. She is a matriculate and holds a diploma in textile design. She married Sukhbir Singh Badal on 21 November 1991. The couple have two daughters and a son. Her brother Bikram Singh Majithia is a member of Shiromani Akali Dal, a former MLA from Majitha and an ex-minister in the Punjab state government led by her father-in-law Parkash Singh Badal.

== Career ==
=== Politics ===
Badal started her political career with the 2009 Indian general election. She was elected to the 15th Lok Sabha from the Bathinda constituency after defeating Indian National Congress candidate Raninder Singh by 120,960 votes. Her first speech was on 3 December 2009, where she expressed her concern about the victims and survivors of the 1984 anti-Sikh riots. She was part of a project named "Nanhi Chhan" to save girl child and trees. Badal has been re-elected as an MP from Bathinda in 2014 having defeated Indian National Congress-People's Party of Punjab joint candidate, Manpreet Singh Badal. For this, she was appointed in the Modi government as State Minister for Food Processing. She got elected for 3rd time in a row from Bathinda in 2019 Lok Sabha election. She defeated the Congress candidate Amrinder Singh Raja Warring in a close fight with around 21,000 votes.

In May 2019, she continued her Ministry of Food Processing Industries.

She resigned from the cabinet on 17 September 2020 to protest against the new farm bills passed by the government.

In 2024 Lok Sabha election, Badal won for the 4th time from Bathinda, securing 376,558 votes, defeating Gurmeet Singh Khuddian of Aam Aadmi Party in the process.

=== Business ===
Badal and her family have direct or indirect interests in many businesses. Members of the Badal family, including Harsimrat's father-in-law and husband have ownership interests in Orbit Resorts, Metro Eco Green Resorts, Saanjh Foundation, Falcon Properties, Dabwali Transport and Orbit Aviation. Her maternal family controls Saraya Industries, Ajnala Power, and Batala Power. Her husband holds a majority stake in the Punjabi language PTC television network.

=== Social work ===
In September 2008, Kaur started the "Nanhi Chhan" project to combat against female foeticide in Punjab, promote women empowerment and to save the trees. It operates in schools, colleges, gurudwaras, temples, churches, and municipal centers. Through this project many girls and women in Punjab villages have been trained in cloth sewing, knitting and flowering.

== See also ==
- Punjab
- Shiromani Akali Dal
- Bathinda

Lok Sabha
Preceded by Paramjit Kaur Gulshan	Member of Parliament for Bathinda; 2009 – present	Incumbent
Political offices
Preceded by Sharad Pawar	Minister of Food Processing Industries; 26 May 2014 – 17 September 2020	Succeeded by Narendra Singh Tomar
