= Desa Singh Majithia =

Sikh general (1768–1832)

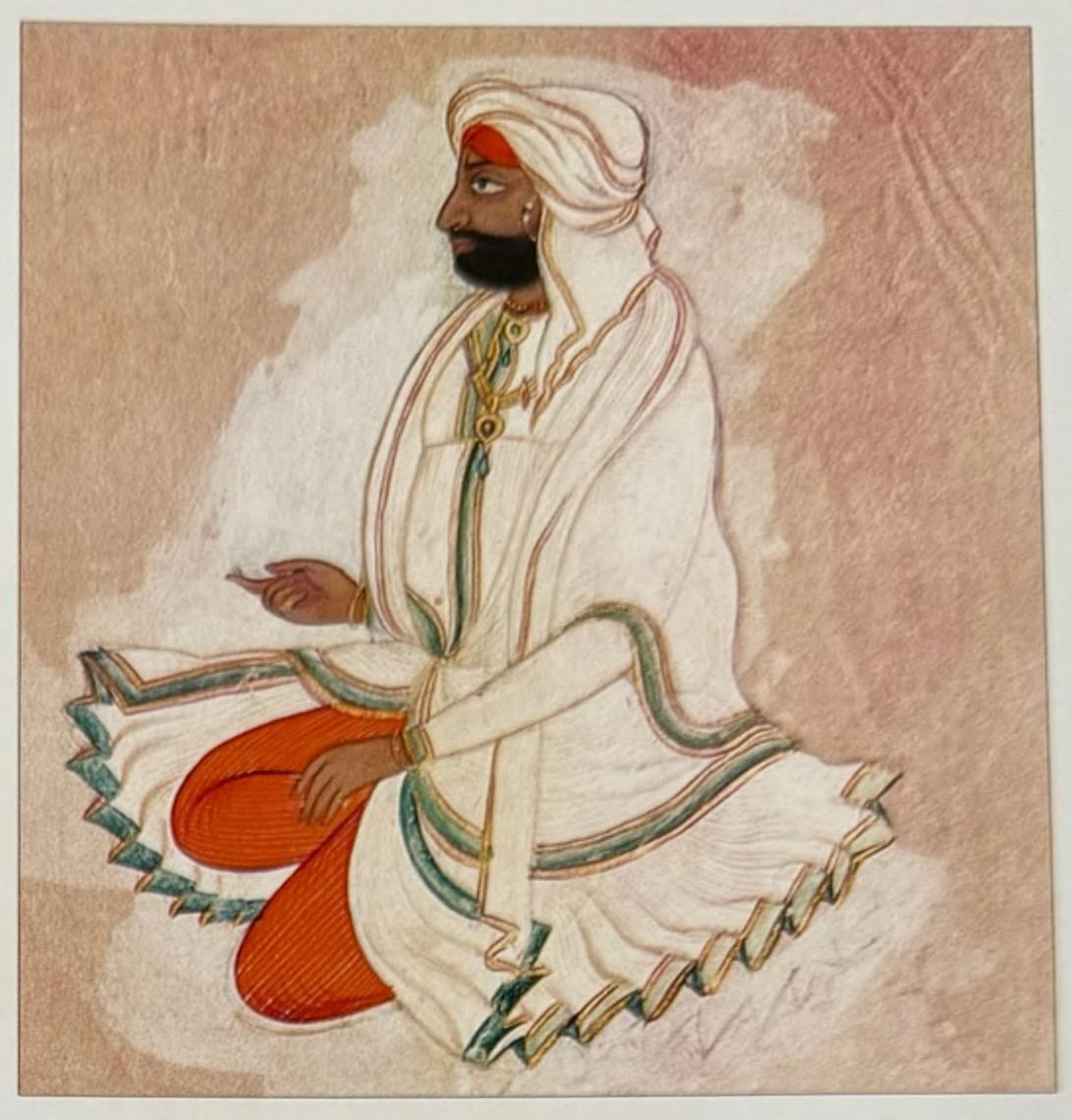
Painting of Desa Singh Majithia

Desa Singh Majithia (1768–1832) was a Sikh jagirdar, military general, and statesman. He served as the first Sikh governor of the Kangra Hills beginning in 1809. He was perhaps one of the earliest Sikh patrons of artwork through the employment of Pahari artists during the period of 1810–30 when he served as governor of the hill states of the Punjab Hills. Desa served as a jagirdar from 1788 to 1832. He belonged to the Majithia family.

== Biography ==
=== Kanhaiya Misl ===
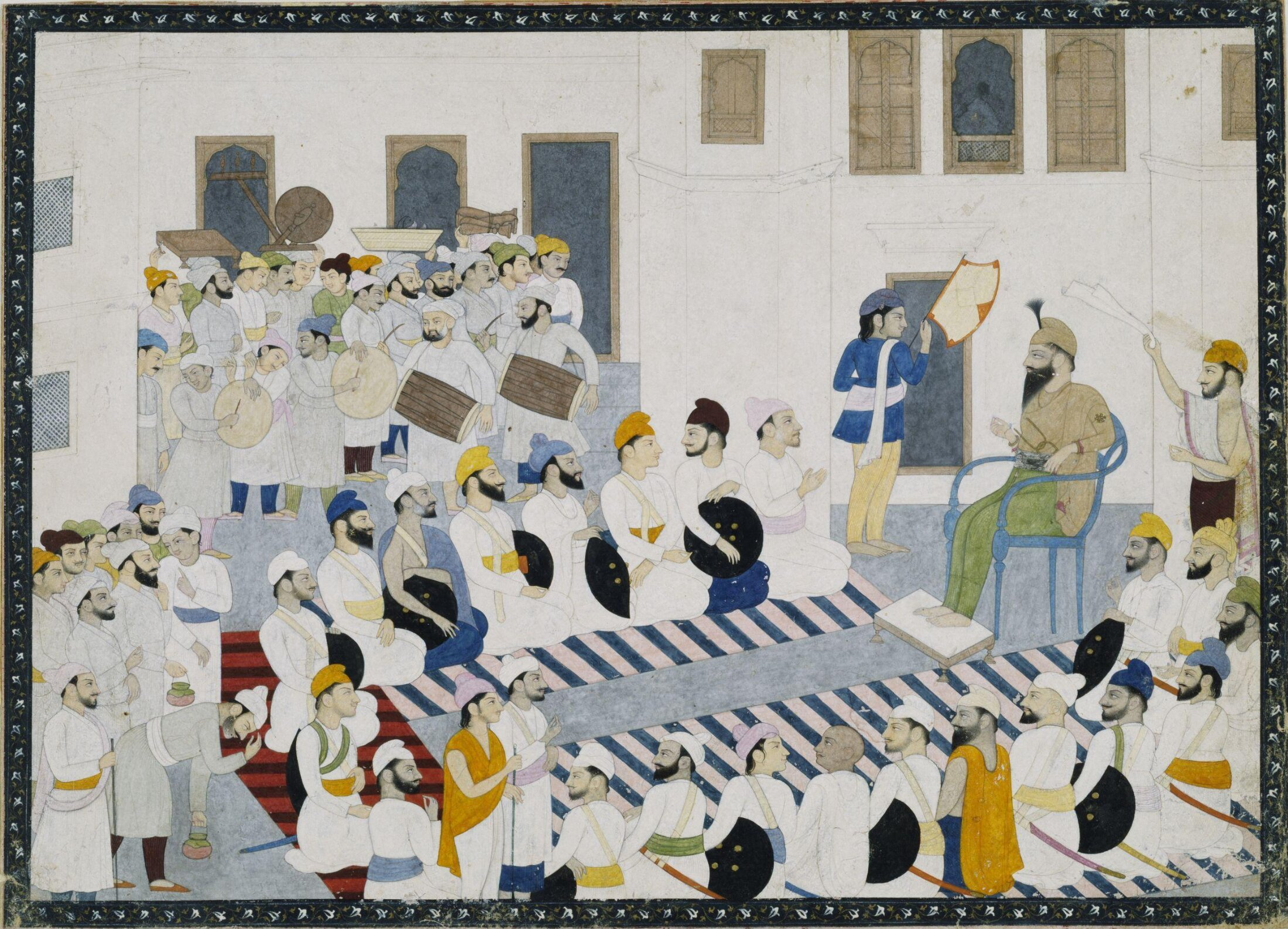
Painting of Desa Singh Majithia receiving a deputation from a state court in the Punjab Hills, ca.1775

Desa was born in 1768 to Naudh Singh, a feudal retainer of Amar Singh Bagga of the Kanhaiya Misl. After the death of his father in 1788, Desa took over the familial jagir (estate). Desa would then serve Buddh Singh Bagga, who himself had succeeded Amar Singh Bagga for some years.

=== Sikh Empire ===
Desa eventually joined the army of Ranjit Singh. In 1804, Desa was given command over 400 sowars. In 1809, after an invitation by Sansar Chand of Kangra, Desa Singh Majithia served in the military expedition to Kangra, which pushed the Gurkhas under the command of Amar Singh Thapa out of the Punjab Hills region. Thus, Desa was promoted to position of the governor of Kangra and the city of Amritsar. Desa took over the role of governor of Kangra from Wazir Naurang, who had been the governor under Raja Sansar Chand. Land formerly under Sada Kaur was bestowed to Desa Singh. In 1813, the area of Haripur, formerly under Raja Bhup Singh, of Guler State, was taken over by Desa. In 1818, Desa served in the Multan campaign. Lehna Singh Majithia was the eldest of the three sons of Desa, and succeeded Desa to the administrative positions after Desa's death.
