= Lehna Singh Majithia =

Governor of Lahore

Sardar Lehna Singh Majithia
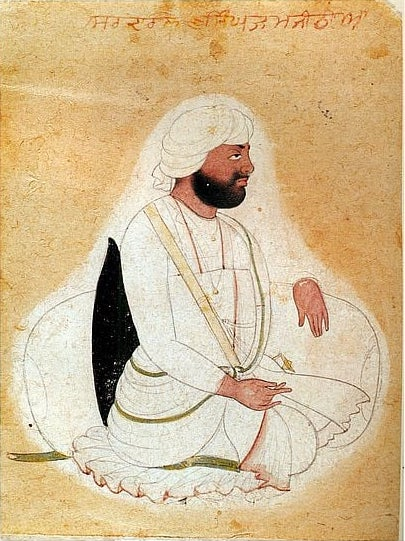
- Portrait of Sardar Lehna Singh Majithia, ca.1830
- Died: 1854; Banaras (modern-day Varanasi)
- Known for: Sikh polymath: scientist, inventor, architect, engineer, mechanic, writer, warrior, and statesman
- Title: Administrator (Nazim) of Amritsar; Governor (Nazim) of Kangra and Hill Districts
- Children: Dyal Singh Majithia
- Parent: Desa Singh Majithia (father)
- Relatives: Gujar Singh (brother); Ranjodh Singh Majithia (younger half-brother)
- Family: Majithia
- Honours: Kasir-ul-Iktidar (Chief of Exalted Dignity); Hasam-ud-Aula (the Sword of the State)

Lehna Singh Majithia (died 1854), also romanized as Lahina or Lahna, was a polymath, inventor, warrior, and statesman. He had an interest in statecraft, architecture, mathematics, astronomy, firearms, mechanics, languages, art, and ordnance. He was a courtier of the Lahore Darbar of the Sikh Empire. Lehna Singh was the father of famous businessman and philanthropist, Dyal Singh Majithia.

== Biography ==
=== Family background ===
Lehna Singh belonged to the Majithia family and was the son of Desa Singh Majithia, a feudal chief who had sworn allegiance to Ranjit Singh in 1809, later serving in the military expedition to Kangra, which pushed the Gurkhas out of the Punjab Hills region. Thus, Desa was named the governor of Kangra and the city of Amritsar. In 1818, Desa served in the Multan campaign. Lehna was the eldest son of Desa.

=== Service in the Sikh Empire ===
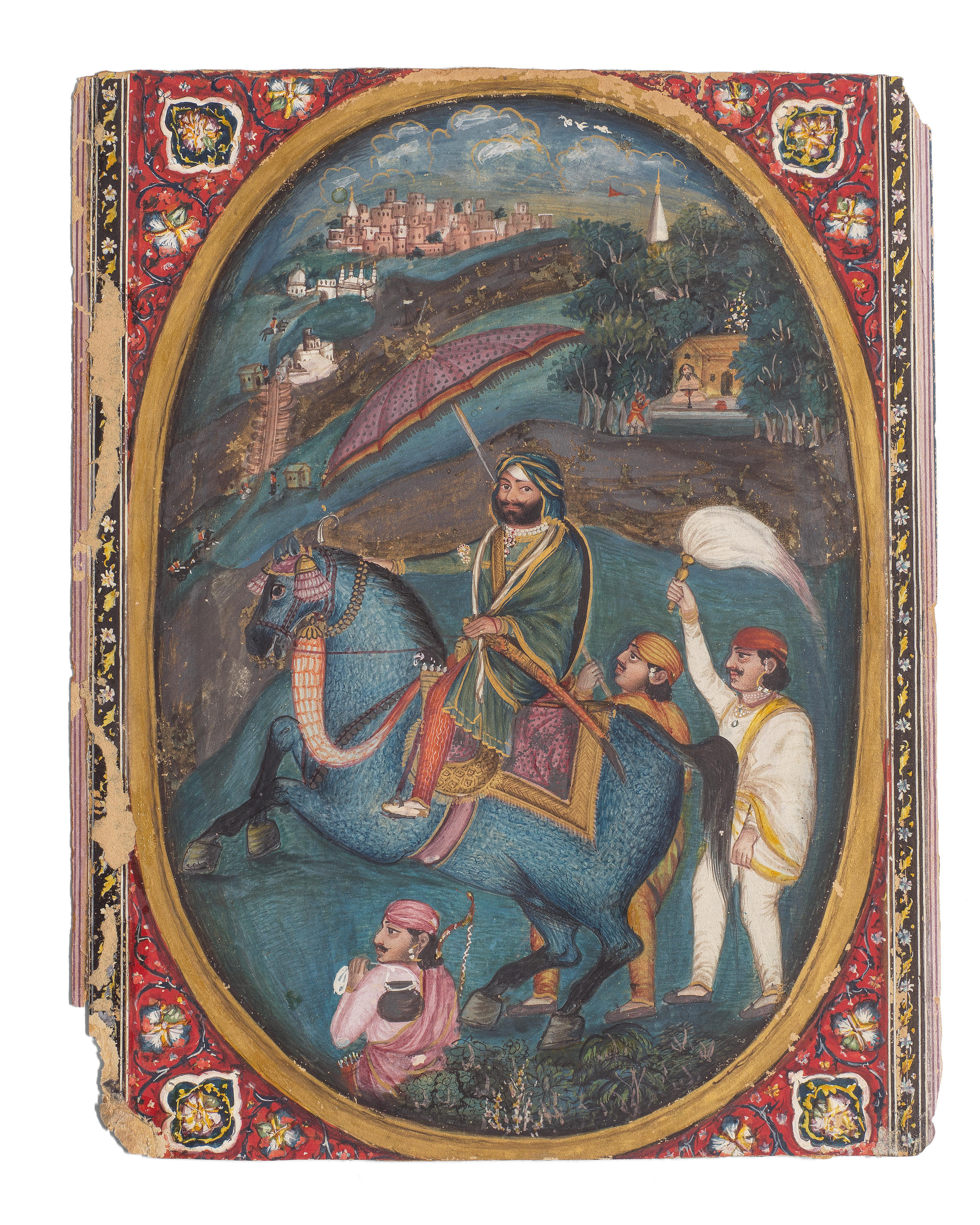
Equestrian painting of Lehna Singh Majithia riding past a walled city, possibly Lahore, beside a flowing river, by the atelier of Imam Bakhsh Lahori, Lahore, ca.1830–40

With the death of his father in 1832, Lehna inherited his father's administrative positions as governor of Kangra and Amritsar. As the governor of the city of Amritsar, Lehna had purview over the governance of the Golden Temple in Amritsar, Sikhism's central shrine. During the governance of Lehna, the Golden Temple underwent renovations, such as the laying of marble slabs around the inner parkarma (temple causeway) of the temple complex, with gardens being established elsewhere in the holy city.

He is noted for having a scientific inclination. Skilled in language-learning, it is purported that Lehna had translated works of Euclid into Punjabi. Lehna assisted general Claude Auguste Court in constructing cannons based on European models.

He was also a skillful mechanic and inventor. He designed a mechanism resembling a clock, showing the hour, the date, the day of the week and the phases of moon and other constellations. At the request of the Maharaja, he also modified the calendar and engaged in astronomy.

He had been awarded the titles of Kasir-ul-Iktidar ('Chief of Exalted Dignity') and Hasam-udaula ('the Sword of the State') by Ranjit Singh.

=== Later life ===
He left Punjab in March 1844 for Haridwar, eventually settling in Banaras. He was arrested and kept under surveillance by the British from 23 January 1846 until the end of the First Anglo-Sikh War. He returned to Punjab in 1851 and stayed for two years before returning again to Banaras where he died in 1854.

== Inventions ==
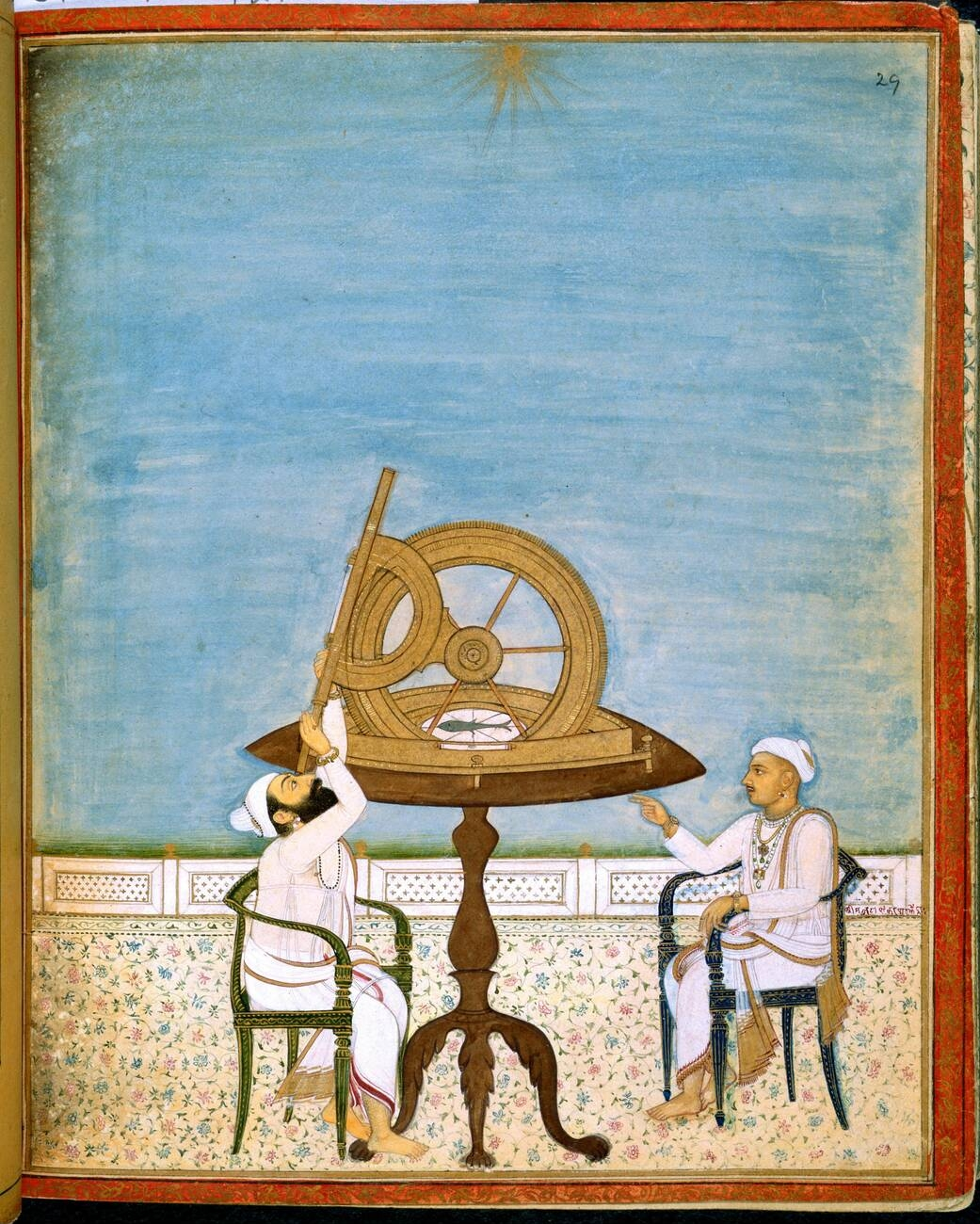
Lehna Singh Majithia stargazing with a telescope accompanied by an astrologically inclined pundit

- Compass
- Sikh calendar
- Sikh firearms (notably pistols)
- Sikh cannons, some of which were renowned as being technologically superior to the cannons the Britishers possessed
- Clock-like mechanism that showed hour, weekday, date, time, moon phase, and constellations. It was called the Dhup Ghari (meaning 'sun clock')

== Construction projects ==
- Supervised the renovation of the Golden Temple and the reconstruction of Amritsar during Sikh-rule
- Assisted with the construction of the Summer Palace of Ranjit Singh (known as Ram Bagh)
- A garden that spread over 84 acres surrounded by a high wall and a moat. It contained rare plant species

== Gallery ==
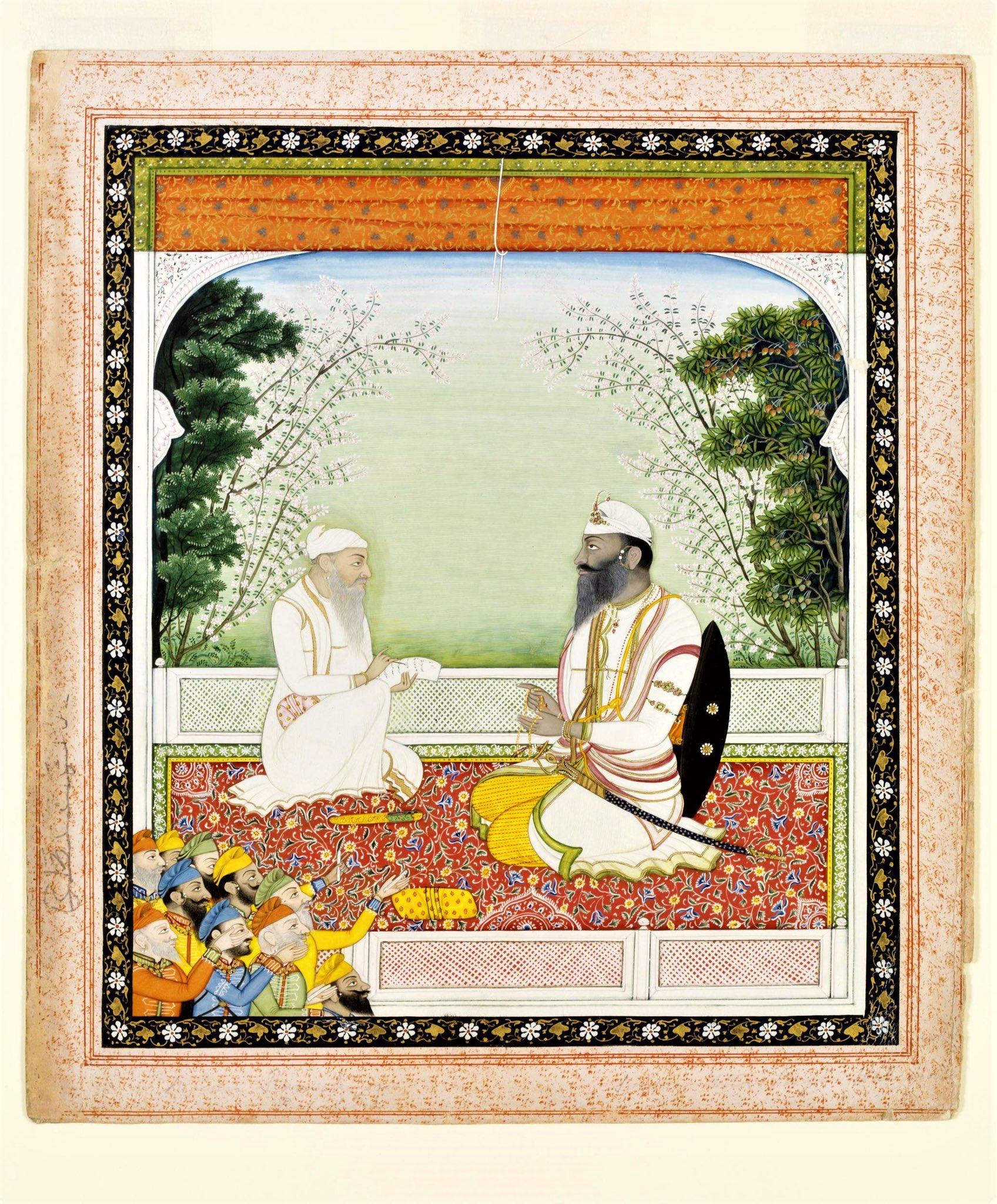
Sardar Lehna Singh Majithia (Water Colour c.1830 Victoria and Albert Museum)

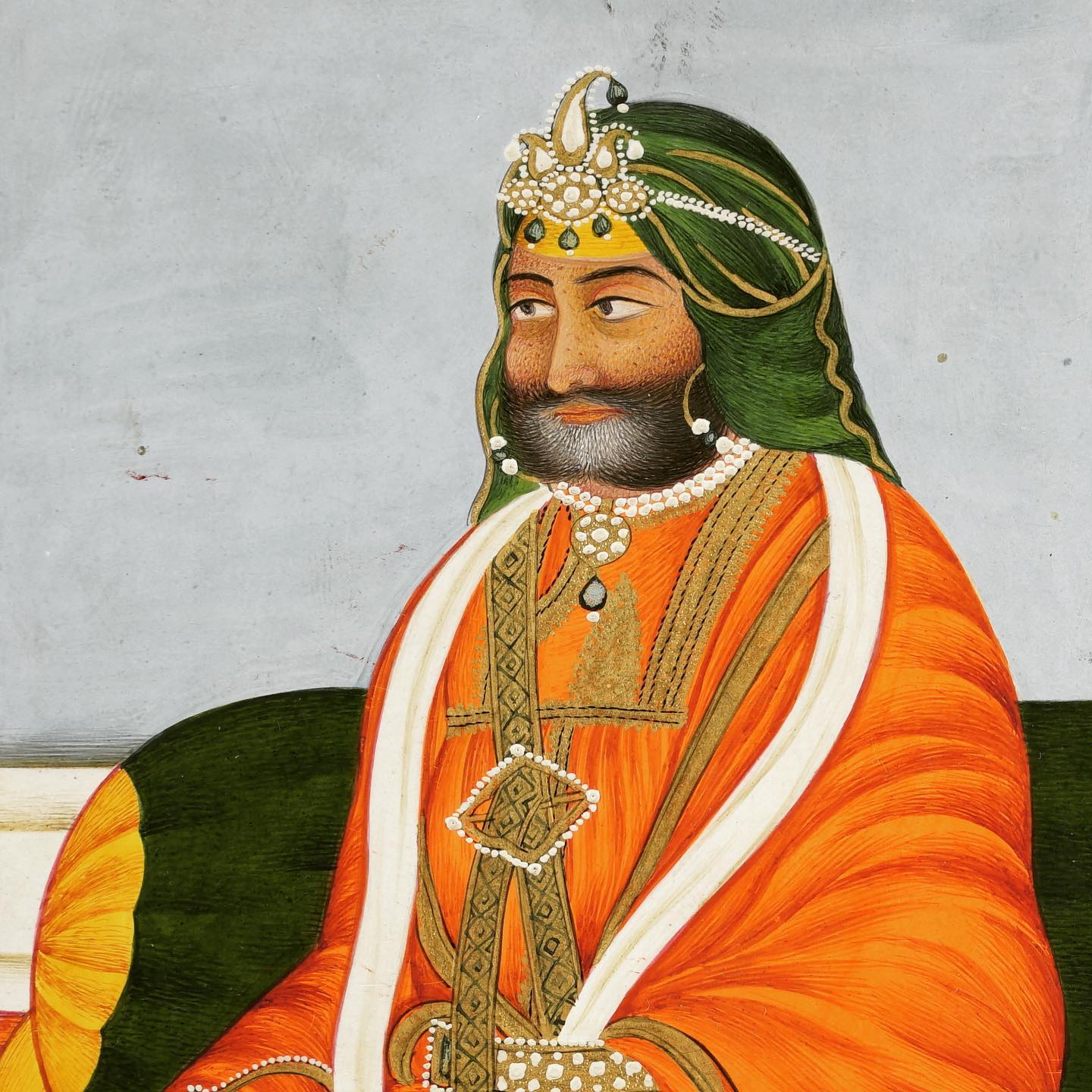
Sardar Lehna Singh Majithia, by Hasan al-Din, Lahore, Punjab, ca.1845–50

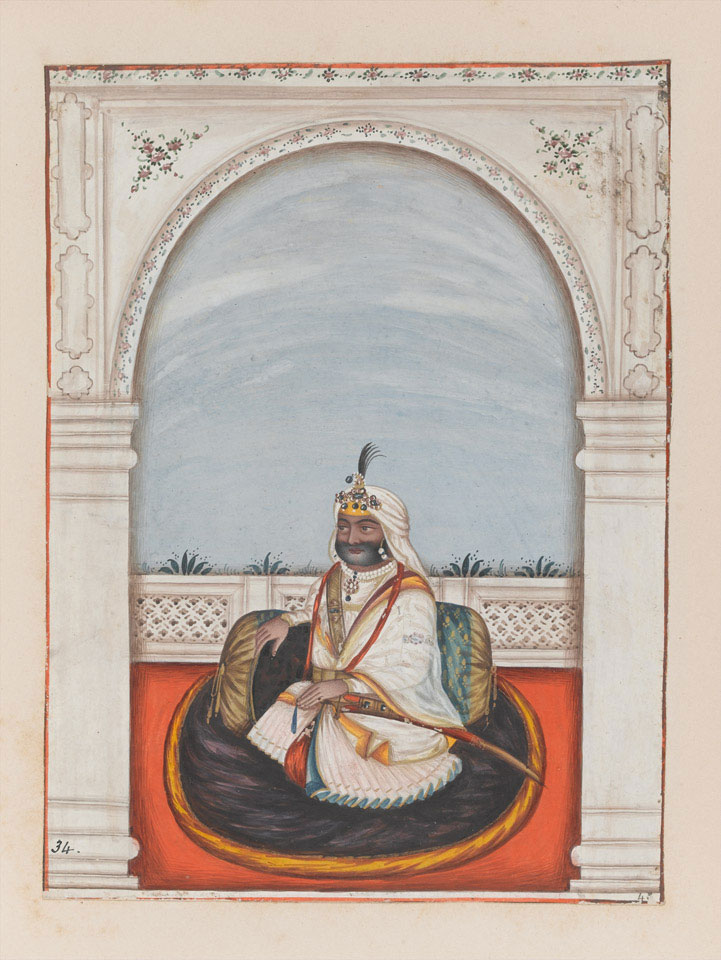
Lehna Singh Majithia, ca.1865 depiction
