= Advocacy =

Public activism

Advocacy is the set of activities by individuals or groups intended to influence decisions within political, economic, and social institutions. It encompasses tactics ranging from grassroots organizing and media campaigns to lobbying, strategic litigation, and coalition-building, and aims to change laws, budgets, institutional practices, and public opinion. Advocacy can include many activities that a person or organization undertakes, including media campaigns, public speaking, commissioning and publishing research. Lobbying (often by lobby groups) is a form of advocacy where a direct approach is made to legislators on a specific issue or specific piece of legislation. Studies of advocacy organizations in the United States and Canada have examined how these groups utilize social media to facilitate engagement and collative action.

== Forms ==
There are several forms of advocacy, each representing a different approach in a way to initiate changes in the society. One of the most popular forms is social justice advocacy. Cohen, de la Vega, and Watson (2001) state that this definition does not encompass the notions of power relations, people's participation, and a vision of a just society as promoted by social justice advocates. For them, advocacy represents the series of actions taken and issues highlighted to change the "what is" into a "what should be", considering that this "what should be" is a more decent and a more just society Those actions, which vary with the political, economic and social environment in which they are conducted, have several points in common. For instance, they:

- Question the way policy is administered
- Participate in the agenda-setting as they raise significant issues
- Target political systems "because those systems are not responding to people's needs"
- Are inclusive and engaging
- Propose policy solutions
- Open up space for public argumentation

Other forms of advocacy include:

- Budget advocacy: another aspect of advocacy that ensures proactive engagement of Civil Society Organizations with the government budget to make the government more accountable to the people and promote transparency. Budget advocacy also enables citizens and social action groups to compel the government to be more alert to the needs and aspirations of people in general and the deprived sections of the community.
- Bureaucratic advocacy: people considered "experts" have more chance to succeed at presenting their issues to decision-makers. They use bureaucratic advocacy to influence the agenda, although at a slower pace.
- Express versus issue advocacy: These two types of advocacy when grouped together usually refers to a debate in the United States whether a group is expressly making their desire known that voters should cast ballots in a particular way, or whether a group has a long-term issue that isn't campaign and election season specific.
- Health, environment and climate change negotiations advocacy: supports and promotes patients' health care rights as well as enhance community health and policy initiatives that focus on the availability, safety and quality of care.
- Ideological advocacy: in this approach, groups fight, sometimes during protests, to advance their ideas in the decision-making circles.
- Interest-group advocacy: lobbying is the main tool used by interest groups doing mass advocacy. It is a form of action that does not always succeed at influencing political decision-makers as it requires resources and organization to be effective.
- Legislative advocacy: the "reliance on the state or federal legislative process" as part of a strategy to create change.
- Mass advocacy: any type of action taken by large groups (petitions, demonstrations, etc.)
- Media advocacy: "the strategic use of the mass media as a resource to advance a social or public policy initiative" (Jernigan and Wright, 1996). In Canada, for example, the Manitoba Public Insurance campaigns illustrate how media advocacy was used to fight alcohol and tobacco-related health issues. We can also consider the role of health advocacy and the media in "the enactment of municipal smoking bylaws in Canada between 1970 and 1995."
- Special education advocacy: advocacy with a "specific focus on the educational rights of students with disabilities."

Different contexts in which advocacy is used:

- In a legal/law context: An "advocate" is the title of a specific person who is authorized/appointed in some way to speak on behalf of a person in a legal process.
- In a political context: An "advocacy group" is an organized collection of people who seek to influence political decisions and policy, without seeking election to public office.
- In a social care context: Both terms (and more specific ones such as "independent advocacy") are used in the UK in the context of a network of interconnected organizations and projects which seek to benefit people who are in difficulty (primarily in the context of disability and mental health).
- In the context of inclusion: Citizen Advocacy organisations (or programs) seek to cause benefit by reconnecting people who have become isolated. Their practice was defined in two key documents: CAPE, and Learning from Citizen Advocacy Programs.

=== Tactics ===
Margaret Keck and Kathryn Sikkink have observed four types of advocacy tactics:

1. Information politics: quickly and credibly generating politically usable information and moving it to where it will have the most impact.
2. Symbolic politics: calling upon symbols, actions, or stories that make sense of a situation for an audience that is frequently far away.
3. Leverage politics: calling upon powerful actors to affect a situation where weaker members of a network are unlikely to have influence.
4. Accountability politics: efforts to hold powerful actors to their previously stated policies or principles.

These tactics have been also observed within advocacy organizations outside the USA. The four tactics popularly described for advocacy networks are information politics, symbolic politics, leverage politics and accountability politics.

=== Use of the Internet ===
Groups involved in advocacy have increasingly used the Internet and social media to increase the speed, reach and effectiveness of communications and mobilization; research has documented both benefits and new challenges for civic engagement in the digital era.

The growth of digital media has allowed advocacy organizations and groups reach wider audiences and facilitate new forms of participation. Digital media has expanded the opportunities for people to participate in advocacy efforts. Through online networks and social media platforms, individuals can engage without necessarily participating through more traditional member-based organizations. Furthermore, participation becomes more personalized, allowing individuals to support and engage in media and foster a more individualized form of advocacy.

Not only has The Internet allowed for individuals to increase advocacy, but it has become a mainstream tool for organizations as well. Advocacy organizations utilize social media to effectively communicate with supporters. Not only does this make sharing information and news about issues and campaigns easier, but it also allows organizations to educate citizens as well as, increasing public awareness and understanding of issues. Which in turn, encourages civic engagement helping connect individuals to efforts and allowing mobilization of supporters and facilitating collective action.

However, social media's role in advocacy extends beyond communication and mobilization. It can be used as a medium for increasing awareness and encouraging public discourse, while also providing opportunities for individuals and communities to share experiences and perspectives; especially marginalized groups. Lastly, online advocacy often works in tandem with traditional forms of advocacy, supporting broader advocacy efforts rather than replacing offline activities such as demonstrations and awareness campaigns.

== Evaluation & ethics ==
Effective advocacy increasingly relies on monitoring and evaluation to show whether campaigns produce intended policy changes; this requires theory-of-change statements, measurement of outputs and outcomes, and careful attention to attribution. Ethical issues include transparency of funding and tactics, privacy concerns in digital organizing, and the risk of manipulative messaging.

=== Other examples ===
Advocacy activities may include conducting an exit poll or the filing of an amicus brief.

== Topics ==
People advocate for a large number and variety of topics. Some of these are clear-cut social issues that are universally agreed to be problematic and worth solving, such as human trafficking. Others—such as abortion—are much more divisive and inspire strongly held opinions on both sides. There may never be a consensus on this latter type of issues, but intense advocacy is likely to remain. In the United States, any issue of widespread debate and deeply divided opinion can be referred to as a social issue. The Library of Congress has assembled an extensive list of social issues in the United States, ranging from vast ones like abortion to same-sex marriage to smaller ones like hacking and academic cheating.

Topics that appear to involve advancing a certain positive ideal are often known as causes. A particular cause may be very expansive in nature — for instance, increasing liberty or fixing a broken political system. For instance in 2008, U.S. presidential candidate Barack Obama utilized such a meaning when he said, "this was the moment when we tore down barriers that have divided us for too long; when we rallied people of all parties and ages to a common cause." Change.org and Causes are two popular websites that allow people to organize around a common cause.

Topics upon which there is universal agreement that they need to be solved include, for example, human trafficking, poverty, water and sanitation as a human right.

"Social issues" as referred to in the United States also include topics (also known as "causes") intended by their advocates to advance certain ideals (such as equality) include: civil rights, LGBT rights, women's rights, environmentalism, and veganism.

== Transnational advocacy ==
Advocates and advocacy groups represent a wide range of categories and support several issues as listed on worldadvocacy.com. The Advocacy Institute, a US-based global organization, is dedicated to strengthening the capacity of political, social, and economic justice advocates to influence and change public policy.

The phenomenon of globalization draws a special attention to advocacy beyond countries' borders. The core existence of networks such as World Advocacy or the Advocacy Institute demonstrates the increasing importance of transnational advocacy and international advocacy. Transnational advocacy networks are more likely to emerge around issues where external influence is necessary to ease the communication between internal groups and their own government. Groups of advocates willing to further their mission also tend to promote networks and to meet with their internal counterparts to exchange ideas.

Transnational advocacy is increasingly playing a role in advocacy for migrants rights, and migrant advocacy organizations have strategically called upon governments and international organizations for leverage.

Transnational advocacy organizations frequently work alongside local groups to better represent community interest and influence policy outcome.

== See also ==
- Advocacy group
- Cause lawyer
- Civil society campaign, a project intended to mobilize public support in order to instigate social change
- Cycling advocacy
- Deep lobbying
- Disability advocacy
- Environmental movement
- LGBTQ advocacy
- Patient advocacy
- Public library advocacy
- Quaxing
- Social change, alteration in the social order
