= Civil society campaign =

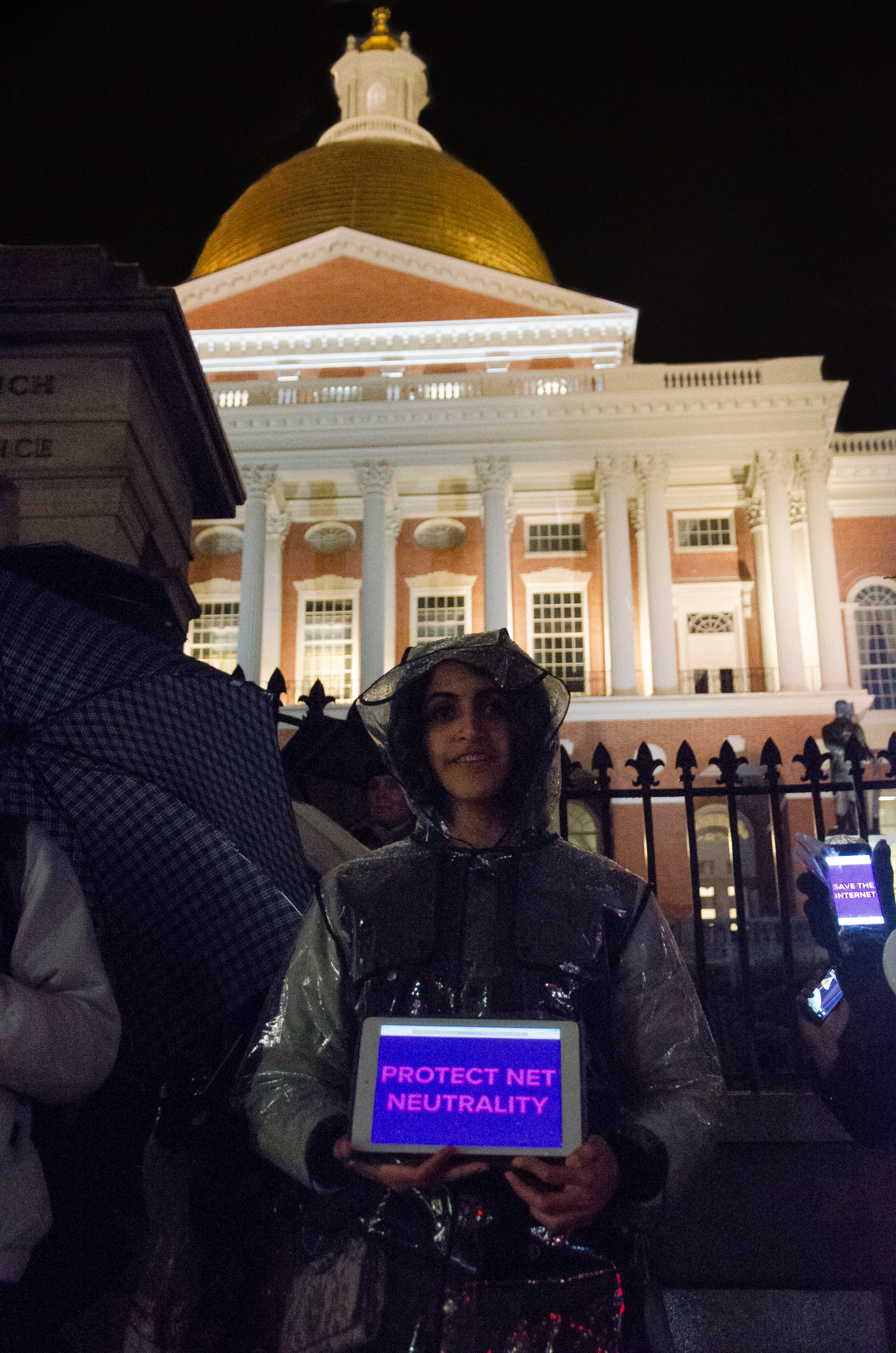
Net Neutrality Vigil demonstrating, USA

A civil society campaign specifically involves civil society, which is the part of society that actively interacts with critical reflection and public deliberation, in order to organize mechanisms like social movements and use democratic tools such as lobbying in order to instigate social change. These campaigns can seek local, national or international objectives. They can be run by dedicated single-issue groups such as Baby Milk Action, or by professional non-governmental organisations (NGOs), such as the World Development Movement, who may have several campaigns running at any one time. Larger coalition campaigns such as 2005's Make Poverty History may involve a combination of NGOs.

Most campaigns are small, such as improving park spaces, creating access for people with disabilities or changing work practices. Some tackle very big issues, like climate change, world poverty and injustice. Campaigning is increasingly recognised as an important way for NGOs to achieve their objectives. Many charities employ campaigners, produce campaigning materials and train their supporters to campaign. The Charity Commission for England and Wales says that “charities may undertake campaigning and political activity as a positive way of furthering or supporting their purposes.”

Campaigns are most successful when groups effectively use strategies that push them toward success. One of these strategies involves influencing public opinion with the intention of mobilizing and garnering support for the issues they advocate for. A successful example of this was the campaign against the Transatlantic Trade and Investment Partnership (TTIP) organized by European civil society organizations which halted negotiations by tapping into public fears concerning food safety and corporate power.

Effective campaigning results in a multitude of different outcomes. The Jubilee 2000 debt campaign which persuaded G7 governments to cancel $100 billion of debt owned by poor countries, releasing more money for development than 1,000 years of Christian Aid in weeks. In the UK, ASH (Action on Smoking and Health)’s campaign for a ban on smoking in public places in 2006 saved over 2,000 lives and billions of pounds a year. The Empty Homes Agency in the UK works directly local authorities to bring thousands of properties into use as a result of a successful amendment to the UK Housing Act 2004.

== Transnational advocacy networks ==
Margaret E. Keck and Kathryn Sikkink, in Activists Beyond Borders, define transnational advocacy networks as "networks of activists, distinguishable largely by the centrality of principled ideas or values in motivating their formation." This definition can be seen in many human rights organizations.

Keck and Sikkink write from a context before the universal availability of information technology and at this point the main actors are the States. The boomerang pattern, argued by Keck and Sikkink, is a model of advocacy where a State A causes "blockage" by not protecting or violating rights. Non-state actors provide other non-state actors from a State B with information about the blockage and those non-state actors inform State B. State B places pressure on State A and/or has intergovernmental organizations place pressure on State A to change its policies.

In order to facilitate transnational advocacy networks, the network needs to have common values and principles, access to information and be able to effectively use that information, believe their efforts will cause change and effectively frame their values. Information use is historically very important to human rights organizations. Human rights methodology is considered "promoting change by promoting facts." By using facts, state and non-state actors can use that viable information to pressure human rights violators.

Human rights advocacy networks focus on either countries or issues by targeting particular audiences in order to gain support. To gain audience support human rights organizations need to cultivate relationships through networking, have access to resources and maintain an institutional structure.

Activists commonly use four tactics in their advocacy efforts: 1) Information politics provides comprehensive and useful information on an issue that otherwise might not be heard from sources who otherwise might be overlooked; 2) Symbolic politics uses powerful symbolic events as a way to increase awareness surrounding an issue; 3) Leverage politics utilizes material leverage (examples such as goods, money, or votes), moral leverage (the "mobilization of shame") or both in order to gain influence over more powerful actors; 4) Accountability politics holds those who make commitments to a cause accountable for their actions or lack thereof.

== Information technology and networked advocacy ==
The widespread availability of the internet, mobile telephones, and related communications technologies enabling users to overcome the transaction costs of collective action has begun to change the previous models of advocacy.

Due to information technology and its ability to provide an abundance of information, there are fewer to no costs for group forming. Coordination is now much easier for human rights organizations to track human rights violators and use the information to advocate for those in need.

One effect is that it is harder for governments to block information they do not want their citizens to obtain. The increase in technology makes it nearly impossible for information not to penetrate everyone around the globe making it easier for human rights organizations to monitor and ensure rights are being protected.

In addition, the fact that the Internet provides a platform for easy group forming, the use of an institutional organization is not essential. With social networking sites and blogs, any individual can perpetuate collective action with the right tools and audience. The need for a hierarchy is diminishing with the great abundance of information available.

== Ethnic Civil Society ==
Ethnic civil society organizations are formed between individuals with the same cultural or ethnic background in which collaboration is fostered to achieve a specific goal that benefits the group as a whole. An example of this is Palestinian NGO's within Israel. The Palestinian Arab citizens of Israel group is a prime example of an ethnic civil society group that uses campaigning and mobilization efforts to achieve the goals of Palestinians living in Israel. This group serves as the Palestinian voice, advocating for Palestinian rights, within the Israeli parliament, in hopes of securing equal rights for the minority population within the state.

== Social media ==
Social media can take many different forms, including Internet forums, weblogs, social blogs, wikis, podcasts, pictures and video. The use of social media by groups as a form of grassroots mobilization in which likeminded individuals are recruited in an effort to carry out a campaign is also an important element to address. This was tested in a research paper title "Does Social Media Promote Civic Activism? A Field Experiment with a Civic Campaign " in which the authors examined a case in Bulgaria with Facebook users that aimed to recruit individuals for an environment focused movement. After conducting their study, the authors find that social media campaigns calling for action about specific issues are most appealing to individuals who are passionate or interested in the issue, rather than those who show little to no interest.

Social media provides awareness to channels that aren't normally followed to raise awareness on these issues, ranging from social to political the platform is able to reach widespread audiences and is able to target various demographics effectively to gain participation in discussion and or movements of importance.

== Stunts and Direct Actions ==
While civil society campaigners may come from a range of political backgrounds, modern campaigning owes its largest debt to the ideas of the Situationists, such as Guy Debord, who recognized that as society falls increasingly under the thrall of the spectacle, it is impossible to generate political momentum without existing in the visual plane. A frequent tactic of civil society campaigns is thus the deployment of high-profile stunts and actions to draw attention to their cause. An example of a stunt is the group Fathers4Justice dressing as popular superheroes and scaling tall buildings to draw attention to their cause.

Direct action on the other hand is politically motivated activity undertaken by individuals, groups, or governments to achieve political goals outside of normal social/political channels.The occupation of the Brent Spar was an example of this. The Brent Spar was a large storage buoy containing oil owned and operated by Shell U.K. located in the North Sea. When the corporation decommissioned the receptacle, it sought to dump the stored oil into the North Sea, even going as far as to obtain permission from the U.K government. Greenpeace, an environmental advocacy group, opposed this and utilized mobilization efforts to stop the deepwater disposal of the Spar, perfectly showcasing direct action rather than a stunt as it had intrinsic influence as well as generating significant publicity.

== Demonstrations ==
A demonstration is a form of nonviolent action by groups of people in favor of a political or other cause, normally consisting of walking in a march and a meeting (rally) to hear speakers. A recent example of this can be observed in the United States, where a civil society organization called Jewish Voice for Peace, organized a protest where about 200 members of the organization gathered outside of the New York Stock Exchange, advocating for Gaza and Lebanon following Israeli attacks.
