= Quax =

Quax may refer to:

- Dick Quax (1948–2018), Dutch-born New Zealand athlete and politician
- Karl "Quax" Schnörrer (1919–1979), German fighter pilot
- Otto "Quax" Groschenbügel, fictional pilot created by Hermann Grote, title character of two film adaptations:
  - Quax the Crash Pilot (1941)
  - Quax in Africa (1947)

== See also ==
- Quaxing, shopping without a private motor vehicle
