= Networked advocacy =

Networked advocacy or net-centric advocacy refers to a specific type of advocacy. While networked advocacy has existed for centuries, it has become significantly more efficacious in recent years due in large part to the widespread availability of the internet, mobile telephones, and related communications technologies that enable users to overcome the transaction costs of collective action.

The study of networked advocacy draws on interdisciplinary sources, including communication theory, political science, and sociology. Theories of networked advocacy have been heavily influenced by social movement literature, and refer to the preexisting networks used to create and support collective actions and advocacy as well as the networks that such actions and advocacy create.

== History and scope of advocacy networks ==
Examples of formal transnational advocacy networks date back to 1823 with the formation of the Society for the Mitigation and Gradual Abolition of Slavery Throughout the British Dominions. Other examples include the women's movement, the environmental movement, and the anti-landmine movement. However, the number, size, and professionalism of networks, as well as the speed, density and complexity of international linkages between and within them, has grown dramatically since the 1960s. While advocacy networks as a whole have been able to grow in size in recent years, they nonetheless continue to vary in scale individually, with Keck and Sikkink noting that networks may operate transnationally, regionally, or domestically. One of the most important changes in recent decades has been in the ability of less formally organized or professionally run networks to grow and develop. Sometimes these networks eventually take on the characteristics of their more professionally managed counterparts, and other times they remain strikingly informal.

Networked advocacy, by its nature, is more likely to be conducted (and to be identified) in a transnational context than a domestic one. But the mistake should not be made of considering only transnational networks of activists to be networked advocacy. A transnational character makes it easier to spot networked advocacy, but an international context is not a prerequisite. Two examples of advocacy networks from different ends of the American political spectrum serve as good illustrations of this point. Tea party activists and the protesters of Code Pink, though advocating for opposing political views, both have a horizontal, loosely connected network structure. Each group comprises smaller nodes dispersed throughout the country that are loosely connected with one another on a national level. These nodes can share lessons, techniques, and even resources, and they occasionally come together for larger conferences or actions. Both of these groups are also primarily focused on U.S. policy, defying the assertion that networked advocacy can only operate in a transnational context.

== Elements of networked advocacy ==
=== Imagined communities ===
Benedict Anderson's 1983 book Imagined Communities defined nations as socially structured communities, and thus nationalism as something imagined by a group of people who perceive themselves as a part of that nation. By the time of Anderson's writing, social constructivism in the concept of nationality was hardly a new phenomenon. Walter Lippmann coined the phrase "pseudo-environment" in his 1922 book Public Opinion to refer to the ways people make sense of their worlds based on what they have individually experienced, what he called "the pictures in our heads". In popular culture, and much more cynically, Kurt Vonnegut had coined the term granfalloon to refer to a group which claims to have a common purpose but is actually meaningless. Vonnegut's main example is the group of people who claim to be Hoosiers and hence believe themselves intertwined by common identity despite having no other social or material connection. What set Anderson apart from these two other writers was his description of the connection between modes of communication and the formation of the modern nation state. According to Anderson, the rise of print-capitalism came with a standardization of language and writing in the vernacular. The standardization of writing allowed for a common discourse to emerge between people who were separated by long distances and experienced no direct personal interactions. This, in turn, enabled common identities to form and "imagined communities" to arise.

Such imagined communities have significantly affected the nature of networked advocacy. The development of international networks concurrent with the rise of inexpensive yet sophisticated information communication technologies has allowed events of seemingly local significance to be scaled to global significance with fewer impediments. The implications of this change in the nature of international advocacy come in terms of both the scope of what organizations and individuals can accomplish and in the scale of their accomplishments. The inherently transnational nature of the associations and tools utilized in such efforts make it quite possible that new nations may arise without the identity of a nation state.

=== Collective action ===
Collective action is the pursuit of a goal or set of goals by more than one person. A group coalesces around a single goal or issue and agitates for change. Collective action is made easier through networked advocacy because the search and information costs of organizing are lowered by new communication networks, especially the internet. The scale-free nature of many organizational networks allows for collective action to be at once organized and leaderless.

James Madison provided a gateway for thinking about collective action in his Federalist No. 10. Madison was concerned with a faction of the population rising up and forming a mob. Madison saw collective action as the workings of factions: Men whose "instability, injustice, and confusion introduced into public councils, have in truth been the mortal disease under which governments have perished." He feared collective action and wanted to avoid and suppress it.

In order to limit the contagiousness of conflict, Madison wanted to raise the transaction costs required for collective action by expanding the size of the public. To Madison, the key to political stability was found in raising the barriers to collective action so that the aggrieved could not find others with similar grievances. Madison advocated for a polity containing a highly varied body of citizens from within a very large geographic entity, making collective action less probable. The model of extending the public sphere lowered the influence of factions, increased the transaction costs for groups attempting to mobilize, and decreased disruption of government affairs.

Transaction costs have had evolving identities since the beginning of their existence. James Madison speaks of transaction costs in Federalist 10. Transaction costs is the cost of the exchange and sharing of information so that individuals, groups and organizations can work together, communicate and achieve a common goal. During the time of James Madison, transaction costs were high. Information technology was crude in form and it took much time and energy to communicate ideas and information with others. Madison knew that this was to his advantage when it came to quelling conflict in the American masses. So long as transaction costs were high, people had less incentive to communicate common grievances with each other and start any conflict with the government or other groups of people. Transaction costs have since evolved and have played key roles in the mobilization of organizations and groups. With the expansion of information technology involving telephones and the internet, people are more apt to share information at low costs. It is now fast and inexpensive to communicate with others. As a result, transaction costs regarding communication and the sharing of information is low and, at times, free. Low transaction costs have allowed for groups of people to join in common causes. The growth of shared information, conflict can be socialized rather than privatized. As a result, people can become more involved in decision making processes and functionality of government and organizations. However, even though there are very low transaction costs among greater populations, there is still the growing issue of changing social capital.

Some scholars have suggested, however, that some elements of Madison's arguments in Federalist #10 need to be revisited. For example, by expanding the sphere, Madison has indeed raised transaction costs. But scholars like E.E. Schattschneider have argued that "the flaw in the pluralist heaven is that the heavenly choir sings with a strong upper class accent." The upper classes are the only ones in society who have the resources necessary for the "mobilization of bias", and thus Madison has unintentionally disenfranchised the lower classes access to political influence. Other holes in Madison's argument are that, in today's digital world of modern telecommunications and instant communication, geographical distance may be meaningless.

Mancur Olson might be called the father of modern collective action theory. His 1965 book, The Logic of Collective Action, takes an economics-based approach to studying when groups do and do not collaborate to achieve common goals. Starting with the assumption of individual rationality, Olson posits that rational individuals will always act in their own self-interest, rather than a collective or group good, unless the group is small or they are coerced in some way. In his model, the costs of participation create an incentive for individuals to "free ride," or rely on others to provide the collective good. This tendency is especially acute in the context of large groups, where individual contributions are difficult to perceive by other group members. Olson suggests that "selective incentives," positive or negative inducements that affect only members of a particular group, along with coercive measures can play a part in overcoming the rational disinclination toward collective action.

Overcoming rational self-interest through Olson's selective incentives can involve significant time and resources, which is why he concludes that "[a]ny group that must organize to obtain a certain good, then, will find that it has a certain minimum organization cost that must be met." He argues that these costs increase as the size of the group increases, making it more likely that a large group will become "latent," or exist only with the potential to mobilize for a common good. He uses these assumptions to conclude that small groups are more efficient than large groups and that formal organizations are necessary for larger groups to meet large, collective objectives. Central to this point is the idea that organizations can shoulder the burden of high collaboration and information costs, both through resources and by managing and coordinating the flow of information.

In Robert Putnam's Bowling Alone, declining social capital is linked to a decline in civic engagement and a general malaise hanging over American democracy. Putnam argues, "[T]he norms and networks of civic engagement also powerfully affect the performance of representative government." He suggests that the decline in social capital formation and civic engagement might be due to women entering the workforce, the "re-potting hypothesis" involving suburbanization and mobility of the American people, demographic changes in American family life, and/or the technological transformation of leisure. He ultimately dismisses the women in the workforce factor, as well as the re-potting hypothesis as major contributing factors to declining social capital, but he suggests that changing demographics as well as the changing nature of the American economy—from family-owned grocery stores to massive supermarkets—may play a role. He encourages further exploration of the technological transformation of leisure, the factor he seems to attribute most to America's declining social capital. Because social norms are continuously changing and people are relying less and less on each other for entertainment and survival, there are new barriers to communication that can hinder collective action. People are less likely to work together in some senses as they are more isolated than ever.

Sidney Tarrow's examination of social movements and contentious politics echoes the sentiments of Putnam's argument and builds on Olson's fundamental understanding of group formation. Tarrow argues that individuals engage in collective action, more specifically "contentious politics," when changes in the political environment generate either opportunities or constraints that create openings for organizations to mobilize individuals to act collectively or to air grievances. When they do so in a sustained way, he argues, it can be called a "social movement." As Sidney Tarrow explains, leaders (whether political, community, or local) employ tactics that appeal to the emotions and identity of the people, and they gain support because the people feel unified emotionally and are easily able to associate with and sympathize towards others in that group. Tarrow's contentious politics arise when people respond to political opportunities and act collectively. Tarrow explains that changes to ICT affect the way that communities deal with contentious politics, which "occurs when ordinary people – often in alliance with more influential citizens and with changes in public mood – join forces in confrontation with elites, authorities, and opponents." She continues, explaining that, "ordinary people take advantage of incentives created by shifting opportunities and constraints…they transform social networks and cultural frameworks into action …the Internet and other forms of electronic communication are changing the nature of mobilization." It is through these changes, Tarrow argues, that "ordinary people have power because they challenge power holders, produce solidarities, and have meaning to particular population groups, situations, and national cultures."

Tarrow also argues that when a collective action is supported by "dense social networks and connective structures," the ostensibly weaker participants in the collective action can sustain their activities against a more powerful opponent. While Tarrow is unsure of whether Putnam's social capital is a necessary condition for collective action, both authors speak of networks as being necessary for collective action. And Tarrow warns that without some formal organization and hierarchy "movements frequently fade away or dissipate their energies," reinforcing the importance of formal, hierarchical organizations.

In Power in Movement: Social Movements and Contentious Politics, Tarrow suggests that the conditions of a political and social environment influence the likelihood of and possibilities for contentious collective action, as "changes in political opportunities and constraints create the most important incentives for initiating new phases of contention." Steven Livingston follows a similar line of theory introduced by Bryan D. Jones and Frank R. Baumgartner in discussing the conditions of political change, arguing that "bursts of rapid and often unpredictable policy change punctuate the patterns of relatively long-term policy equilibria." In "Networks of Outrage and Hope" Manuel Castells argues that movements are "usually triggered by a spark of indignation related to a specific event or to a peak of disgust with the actions of the rulers." (2012, p. 224). Castells makes the case for the importance and relevance of new technologies as a tool for organizing action. Networks are created in multiple ways, resulting in online and offline actions. Groups that are repressed or angry, use digital networks to find each other and create and consolidate their connections: "Enthusiastic networked individuals, having overcome fear, are transformed into a conscious collective actor." (219) His work focuses on the outrage that protesters have generally used as a catalyst for movements throughout history: "[Social movements] usually stem from a crisis of living conditions that makes everyday life unbearable for most people. They are prompted by a deep distrust of the political institutions managing society. The combination of a degradation of the material conditions of life and of a crisis of legitimacy of the rulers in charge with the conduct of public affairs induces people to take matters into their own hands, engaging in collective action outside the prescribed institutional channels, to defend their demands and, eventually, to change the rulers and even the rules shaping their lives." Others suggest that when the costs—the relative amounts of time, money or effort required—of information and collaboration are low due to an area's "information abundance" or the affordances of information and communication technologies, collective action will be more likely to occur and more capable of occurring on a large scale.

Castells further argues that this sense of outrage stems from individuals reacting against the networks of power that have come to fail them. In the case of Iceland, he writes, "Their outrage from the realization that the democratic institutions did not represent the interests of citizens because the political class had become a self-reproducing cast that was catering to the interests of the financial elite and to the preservation of their monopoly over the state" (Castells, p. 42, 2012.) Here, the organizations and institutions meant to provide, in a sense, for the well-being of the individuals have failed in their mission, and the people (Icelanders) need to look elsewhere if they are going to have their grievances rectified. These individuals may operate in the "networked space," where existing distributions of power among networks can be challenged or altered, a concept Castells further examines in his other work. It is in this space where individuals and fellow grievance-holders can connect with one another and create a larger social movement.

It is in this space where technology also starts to examine properties similar to organizational forms used to promote political autonomy (Castells, p. 103, 2012.) Castells points to prior research showing how different ICTs contributed to changing the level of social participation in places like Egypt, and how involvement in these digital networks made for stronger social movements. In describing the connection between ICTs and the strength of movements, Castells writes that the research found a "significant effect on the intensity and power of these movements, starting with a very active debate on social and political demands in the social media before the demonstrations’ onse," (Castells, p. 104, 2012.) his illustrates Earl and Kimport's Theory 2e0, in which an individual's use of technology can affect the processes of collective action before influencing its eventual outcomes.. This transformative use of technology can also be seen in Castells’ brief discussion of Iceland's newest constitution. In drafting its national constitution, the Constitutional Assembly Council fielded thousands and thousands of suggestions and comments of what should be included in the document text. Citizens interacted with members of the council via digital networks, across social media platforms and in-person debates, (Castells, p. 39, 2012) a construction of suggestions built essentially through crowdsourcing, as Castells notes. This exemplifies a change in the participatory process brought on not because of technology, but because of how the individuals chose to use technology for the purpose of collective action – in this case to write a national constitution.

In international relations, collective action is often required to traverse vast geographic distances and to cross national borders. Margaret Keck and Kathryn Sikkink create a foundation for understanding collective action and transnational advocacy networks, taking the theories of social movements defined by Tarrow and others to a transnational level – increasing the scale of collective action while staying grounded in Olson's high-cost understanding of group formation and the need for formal organizations. Keck and Sikkink differentiate transnational advocacy networks (TANs) from traditional modes of organizing by explaining that they are "motivated by values rather than by material concerns or professional norms." TANs form around ethical issues, particularly those involving physical harm and inequality of opportunity: the abolition of slavery and the influence of the British anti-slavery movement on public opinion in the United States; the international movement advocating for women's right to vote, which gained traction from the anti-slavery moment; the movement to ban female foot binding in China and the movement against female genital mutilation in Kenya. Their boomerang model is an international relations collective action theory that creates a framework for how an advocacy movement travels from one country to another through different actors. In their model, blockages exist between domestic NGOs and their domestic governments. These blockages amount to more than the governments simply ignoring the grievances of people and domestic NGOs. They can include censorship, incarceration, violence, and death. For Keck and Sikkink, the goal of transnational advocacy is to lower these barriers, or decrease transaction costs, in order for change to occur. When this is not possible, the NGO will go to outside sources, using information exchanges, to find an entity that is able to put pressure on the state in question. NGOs seek help from other states, NGOs, and intergovernmental organizations in order to achieve a goal within an offending state. In the face of blockage by the state, NGOs are forced wto ork with a secondary, outside entity to make their problems heard and addressed. This theory of blockages is similar to John Gaventa's Second Dimension of Power, in which "power is exercised not just upon participants within the decision-making process but also towards the exclusion of certain participants and issues altogether." Keck and Sikkink's boomerang model is relatable to John Gaventa's assertion that routines and internalization of roles or false consensus lead to acceptance of the status quo by the dominated, simply because over time they become oblivious to their own conditions. However, they advance this notion and argue that the way to escape this is via third-party states and advocacy on behalf of those dominated communities.

In essence, Keck and Sikkink define a form of transnational collective action that uses information as a tactic. The result is that transnational advocacy networks’ "ability to generate information quickly and accurately and deploy it effectively, is their most valuable currency; it is also central to their identity." Just as Olson and Tarrow make clear, when information is a resource (and, in this case, a commodity) with some scarcity, collaboration costs can be high and organizations become more important. Keck and Sikkink acknowledge this, particularly from the global perspective. That is why, just like Olson and Tarrow, their theory is dependent on formal, hierarchical organizations. In their case, a network of them that work together to compile information and then deploy it when opportunities arise.

According to E.E. Schatschneider's socialization of conflict thesis, expanding the scope of a conflict is an essential strategy for weaker parties and is the basis of collective action. Individuals band together when attempting collective action in order to overcome the power of their opponent. Their efforts are more sustainable when the collective actions are strengthened by networks. In networked advocacy, the networks in question are not necessarily strong social networks like Putnam describes, but instead consist of the numerous weaker connections people can make every day through modern mass communication.

Bruce Bimber attempts to bring existing theories of group formation and collective action up-to-date by directly addressing what he identifies as shifts in information technologies and collaboration costs, while building on many of the concepts identified by Olson, Tarrow, and Keck and Sikkink. Bimber identifies four "information regimes" that are defined both by the dominant ways in which information was shared during the set periods of time – representative democracy, the Penny Press, political intermediaries broadcasting – and the political structures that resulted from them. He argues that the current regime is characterized by "information abundance" and that information "is easily produced by virtually anyone, widely distributed, and cheap or free," which he says means that collective action no longer requires the formal organization. Bimber sees collective action as a function of interaction and engagement. He argues that the present era is a time of organizational fecundity featuring a rise in many types of organizations, including social media networks, organizationless organizations having no tangible presence except perhaps on a computer server, and more traditional organizations. Despite this fecundity, Bimber argues that organizations still matter and that formal organizations still thrive.

Lance Bennett and Alexandra Segerberg propose a new model called the "logic of connective action" – in direct response, or as a direct update, to Olson's 1965 work. As they explain, the "emerging alternative model… applies increasingly to life in the late modern societies in which institutions are losing their grip on authority and group ties are being replaced by large-scale, fluid social networks." They also point to the needs of younger generations, arguing that not only has the technology changed, but so has the public's familiarity with organizations and different forms of action. Bennett and Segerberg connect this new model to Olson's theory of rational choice and the foundation of Tarrow and Keck and Sikkink by explaining that old models were based on "overcoming individual resistance." They argue that the new information environment, with new increases in the availability of information, the ability to personalize messages and individual incentives to share, has created a situation where groups can self-organize and self-interest is less of a hurdle to achieving collective goods.

A key piece of Bennett and Segerberg's theory is what they call "personalized action frames" that can originate with an organization that chooses to step back and let the public adapt them, or they can happen spontaneously. As they explain, referring back to Olson and rational choice theory, new technology and the ability to easily engage with content can overcome individual resistance, the need for selective incentives and, thus, the costs of collective action. They suggest that there is now a fundamental interest in sharing one's ideas and content, not purely for altruistic reasons.

Bimber, Flanagin and Stohl direct attention to how uses of modern information and communication technologies in collective action directly challenge two main tenets of traditional theory. These are the "free-rider" problem and the importance of formal, hierarchical organization. The authors point to a series of examples, like the 1999 "Battle in Seattle," to show how substantial collective action occurred without rigid organizational structures. This collective action, "involved a loosely coupled network without central financing or a fixed structure for leadership, decision making, and recruitment. Instead, of these traditional features, the network employed low-cost communication and information system…" (Bimber, Flanagin & Stohl, 2005, p. 370.)

Expanding on the work of Bimber and his colleagues in discussing the "Battle in Seattle" protests of the World Trade Organization in 1999 as an example of new forms of loose, often leaderless networks, Bennett presses this further in labeling it an example of a "hyper-organization" or a meta-organization that "existed mainly in the form of the website, e-mail traffic and linked sites". Instead of simply magnifying the effectiveness of the various transnational organizations involved in mobilizing protests, online and mobile technologies have now begun to transform the organizational forms of such groups into the looser, less hierarchical structures to which Bimber and his colleagues eluded.

Similarly, along with reduced costs, Lance Bennett finds that digital environments, and the people that enjoy working in them, are naturally predisposed to favor large-scale networks of people with loose personal and ideological ties. He observes that this digital influence has created a new kind of advocacy "organization," one that is more like an "association" of people who are drawn to "easy-to-personalize, but politically ambiguous themes." These organizations can reach scale quickly, even spontaneously, as information about "crisis, dramatic events, and widely shared grievances travel" quickly through the digital space, and social media. Bennett identifies a trade off between this increased ease of mobilizing large numbers of people quickly and cheaply, and the fact that they are characterized by loose ties and less clear ideological interests – maybe even at the risk of "incoherence."

Although, Bennett and Segerberg discuss the possibility of self-organization facilitated by new technologies and kept intentionally separate from formal organizations, they argue that these networks lack the organization necessary to form coherent political agendas. Their proposal is, therefore, intended to be a "middle way" or "third pattern" of organization that falls somewhere between self-organizing and traditional networks so that organizations can provide a "networking backbone" after largely self-organized groups have formed.

=== Transaction costs ===
Transaction costs are barriers to collective action that might prevent like-minded individuals from forming a group, faction or social movement based on shared values, ideas or sentiments. Transaction costs include search and information costs, bargaining and decision-making costs, and policing and enforcement costs. The advantage of networked advocacy lies in its ability to lower the transaction costs of collective action by taking advantage of modern mass communication media and scale-free networks.

In Federalist No. 10 James Madison argues that, in order to preserve the union, governing should be left "to a small number of citizens elected by the rest" and that by expanding the size of the republic "you make it less probable that a majority of the whole will have a common motive to invade the rights of other citizens; or if such a common motive exists, it will be more difficult for all who feel it to discover their own strength." Madison is essentially arguing that, in order to preserve the United States, the transaction costs of forming tyrannical majorities must be raised. Institutions and geographic distance are the costs Madison seeks to impose on factions, through the United States Congress and the sheer size of the United States.

Robert Putnam argues that due to the decrease in group membership throughout society within the last few decades, individuals no longer have as many social ties to organizations and the other people belonging to those organizations. This creates increased transaction costs for collective action. Without the pre-existing connections associated with organizational membership, increased effort is required to find those with similar grievances, which raises transaction costs for collective action.

Sidney Tarrow refers to transaction costs as political constraints because they discourage the development of contentious politics that permit ordinary people to join forces in order to confront elites, authorities, and opponents. In Margaret Keck and Kathryn Sikkink's Boomerang Model, State A raises the costs of collective action on domestic NGOS to the point where the domestic NGOs must appeal to other NGOs, states, and intergovernmental organizations for assistance in a transnational advocacy network. E.E. Schattsneider's concept of privatization of conflict is another example of increasing transaction costs to limit the scope of a conflict and thus the likelihood of collective action.

=== Scope of conflict ===
The scope of conflict is an aspect of the scale of political organization and the extent of political competition. Pressure groups are small-scale organizations while political parties are large-scale organizations. Hence, the outcome of the political game depends on the scale on which it is played. As Schattschneider notes, "People are not likely to start a fight if they are certain that they are going to be severely punished for their efforts. In this situation repression may assume the guise of a false unanimity."

Schattschneider develops the idea of controlling the scope of conflict. The most important strategy of politics and advocacy is concerned with the scope of conflict. A conflict can either be privatized, containing its scope, or socialized, expanding its scope. The audience determines the contagiousness of the conflict. The relative power of the two disputants plays little part in the perceptual outcomes of the conflict. An actor or disputant who has successfully created collective action frames that win the hearts and minds of the audience is slated to be perceived as the winner despite any actual weakness. When privatizing conflict, a disputant who desires to control the audience may limit audience participation by a variety of means, including localizing the conflict or minimizing audience size. When socializing conflict, an audience's size may demonstrate potential for alliances and eventual expansion of audience dynamics. Such methods of audience management are meant to diminish or maximize benefits within the scope of conflict.

Madison first referenced the scope of a conflict through his discussion of privatization of conflict by means of extending the public sphere. Schattschneider also raises the issue of the mobilization of bias. Advocacy organizations reflect their costs of organizing. In his argument, Schattschneider emphasizes that resources are not evenly distributed. To Schattschneider, the "flaw in the pluralist heaven is that the heavenly chorus sings with a strong upper-class accent." Only the wealthy have the capability to have their interests heard. Therefore, the wealthy are more likely to find representation through advocacy, which Schattschneider refers to as the "upper class tendency." Bruce Bimber argues that Schattschneider's view that only wealthy interests can be represented in the pressure group system is largely irrelevant today due to the low transaction costs of using electronically enabled networks. We now live in a world of information abundance; the cost of information and the transaction costs associated with it are much lower due to the availability and manageability of information. Thus, the ability to socialize a conflict is greatly enhanced by the use of information technology. He acknowledges that the internet has allowed for information to become abundant, inexpensive, and widely available to the public. As a result of easy access to information, traditional boundaries faced by organizations are changing and becoming less significant. Adaptation is necessary for many more established organizations. Organizations such as political parties and older non-profits must change the way they market themselves and communicate with the public in order to keep their message and outreach as strong as it was prior to the birth of the internet. Because of the birth of this new information technology, people are also becoming more adept at founding organizations and reaching out to a broader population. The internet is allowing people to come together under their specific interests. Additionally, organizations are no longer restricted from forming due to the limitations of "brick and mortar". Movements and groups can have a presence without having a physical home base.

=== The importance of social ties ===
Another aspect of Networked advocacy, and one that has been hotly debated by theorists and thinkers, is the question of how important strong social ties are to the success of advocacy. Traditional social movement theorists, like Sidney Tarrow, Doug McAdams, and others, believe that strong social ties between members are essential to maintaining a movement. Even Keck and Sikkink, writing about more attenuated communities of activists, underscore the importance of social ties forged at conferences and meetings. They believe these kinds of strong connections facilitate the maintenance of transnational networks.

The rise of networked advocacy and Internet-enabled social organization created a schism in the field of advocacy studies. Researchers including Robert Putnam, Sidney Tarrow and W. Lance Bennett argue that the Internet is an essentially impersonal organizational experience. Princeton researcher Alejandro Portes argues that true social networks depend on face-to-face contacts and the social cohesion of shared physical geography. Recent research on the role of networked advocacy using Facebook led to the term "slacktivism" to define the low-impact advocacy involved in simply "liking" a cause as opposed to taking an active role in a defined group. Evgeny Morozov discussed the applications of slacktivism in foreign policy in a May 19, 2009, blog post for Foreign Policy magazine.

Putnam's frustration with the changing role of social ties in civic engagement and social capital formation pre-dates the rise of the internet, but strongly mirrors Evgeny Morozov's criticism about low-effort acts of social engagement. As noted by Putnam in "Bowling Alone", mass membership organizations like The Sierra Club and American Association of Retired Persons (AARP) are significantly different from civic associations and other venues for collective action of the past. These mass membership organizations, Putnam argues, allow members to be very loosely connected, perhaps only by shared values or ideals. Members may never knowingly encounter another member of the organization and their ties are to the organization's principles and not to one another as in traditional civic groups. Membership in such mass membership organizations may solely consist of writing a check or reading a newsletter and not sustained or more in-depth actions, which may facilitate more active engagement leading to a higher propensity for social change.

Manuel Castells believes that organizations occupy a hybrid-space, often moving fluidly on and off of online spaces. Therefore, they gain all the advantages of digital networks, without sacrificing strong ties. Hedescribes this ability to transitio.between networked and physical spaces as allowing participants to engage in face-to-face interaction, share experiences and difficulties, and collectively encounter the conditions associated with physical demonstrations. Meanwhile,"online social networks allowed participants to communicate their experiences to a wider audience and provided forums for solidarity, debate, and strategic planning. Castells provides a bridge of sorts between traditional observers of collective action and the most radically pro-digital literature. While he rejoices in the possibilities for digitally enabled communication and the creation of a new space where the elite and non-elite begin on a more even playing field, he clearly has a deep appreciation for the strong ties that come with sharing physical experience— especially the risk and fear associated with public actions.

On January 19, 2011, Clay Shirky broached the subject of whether online activism is the result of a community that truly exists as an online community, or whether online activism merely enables connected activists to expand the sphere of conflicts that are essentially local. Morozov explained Shirkey's main critique of electronically enabled activism networks:

On Clay's account, "social media" is just a tool that people use to coordinate. So, saying that people want a revolution because of "social media" is akin to saying that people want a revolution because of the telephone.

=== Social movements ===
Networked advocacy theory builds in part on the social movement theory of Sidney Tarrow. In his 1998 book Power in Movement, Tarrow tries to explain the cyclical history of social movements (visible in the form of the protest cycles). Like Schattschneider and Madison, Tarrow believes politics is contentious and riddled with conflict. He also shows how movements can affect various spheres of life, such as personal lives, policy reforms and political cultures. According to Tarrow there are four prerequisites for sustainable social movements:

1. Political opportunities;
2. diffuse social networks;
3. familiar forms of collective action (also known in Charles Tilly's terms as repertoires of contention); and 4) cultural frames that can resonate throughout a population.

A cornerstone of Tarrow's contentious politics is the "Repertoires of Contention," a concept originally developed by Tilly as "the ways people act together in pursuit of shared interest," (Tarrow, 2011, p. 39.) A key aspect of the "repertoires of contention," is that the repertoires include, "not only what people do when they are engaged in conflict with others but what they know how to do and what others expect them to do," (Tarrow, 2011.) An example of a repertoire, as discussed in Power in Movement, is the barricade used during the later periods of the French Revolution in the 1840s. The barricade illustrates the "do" and "what they know how to do," dynamic. As Alexis de Tocqueville noted of the barricades they were, "skillfully constructed by a small number of men who worked industrially – not like criminals…Nowhere did I see the seething unrest I had witnessed in 1830…" (Tarrow, 2011, p. 38.)

Despite Tarrow's work having been published before the widespread use of Internet-based social media websites such as Twitter and Facebook, Tarrow's theoretical framework provides a means of analyzing whether and how social media outlets and digital communications technologies develop sustained, diffuse networks of social advocates. The role of the Internet and digital social media in lowering opportunity costs related to social action has since been studied in-depth by communications scholars such as Steven Livingston and Matthew Hindman, as well as by TIME Magazine foreign policy writer Lev Grossman.

==== Relationship between social movements and networked advocacy ====
The delineation between social movements and advocacy networks is a particularly thorny issue for understanding and defining networked advocacy. In a real world context, the difference can be easily identified. Think, for example, of the 2011 insurgent movement in Egypt as opposed to the International Campaign to Ban Landmines. The former was a grassroots, somewhat spontaneous movement with no designated leader. The latter comprises a network of organizations in different countries, as well as a central organization, which employ elite staffs of professionals, and which work with governments and intergovernmental bodies to ban land mines.

This high/low dichotomy is one clear example of the difference between the two types of action and advocacy, but often the distinction is blurred. Social movements can work with and rely on the support of advocacy networks, though the reverse is less common. The notion of networked advocacy can encompass both types of action and contributes to the success, structure and development of each. The question remains, however, whether networked advocacy could or should bridge the gap between the two.

According to Tarrow, transnational advocacy networks are powerful in promoting change for three reasons: "First, many of them are biographically and thematically in the debt of social movements. Second, given the undemocratic or semiauthoritarian conditions of many parts of the world today, they provide a safer alternative to social movements for millions of people. Third, their most important role may be to provide a mechanism for the diffusion of collective action frames to resource-poor domestic actors that can help them construct their own social movements." Despite their effectiveness in these capacities, Tarrow considers advocacy networks "second-best" to social movements and notes that they lack "the drama, the deliberate contentiousness, and the broad goals" of international movements because of their dependence on funding and support from foundations and government.

=== Information exchange ===
Bennett and Manheim describe a modern one-step flow of communication, in contrast to the traditional model of a two-step flow: "[T]he availability and content of each message having been shaped upon transmission to anticipate and replace the social interaction component of the two step flow." Bennett and Manheim argue for the existence of a different type of information recipient who is no longer dependent on opinion leaders to contextualize a message. Rather, technological changes have isolated citizens from each other and have redefined our individual communication habits.

Where citizens once contextualized social cues from each other, social cues can now be embedded in the media and technology content itself. Bennett and Manheim stress that technology and audience relationships "point to an increasing individuation and reception of information." Given an environment where social connectivity has become increasingly fragmented, as Putnam has argued, the emergence of new technologies with more targeted approaches creates a new type of interaction between and among people.

As noted by Keck and Sikkink, the role of information exchange is central to networked advocacy. Actors within a network mobilize information strategically to persuade, pressure, and gain leverage over much more powerful organizations, including governments.

Keck and Sikkink describe four tactics that actors within networks can use to persuade and pressure. First is information politics, where networks gather credible and politically acceptable information quickly. Second is symbolic politics, where networks use symbols, actions or stories to appeal to audiences in different locations. Third is leverage politics, where networks appeal to powerful actors that can influence the situation when weaker actors in the network may not be capable. Fourth is accountability politics, where networks use the policies and statements of powerful actors to hold them to their words. The central theme of all four tactics is information and the ability of networks to use it effectively.

Other scholars studying advocacy have made similar arguments. While some disagree over the most accurate model of successful transnational advocacy, almost all of the relevant literature places a premium on analyzing the communications strategies chosen by advocacy campaigns and determining how and why those strategies were or were not effective.

=== Communications theory in networked advocacy ===
Research demonstrates that individuals receive and process information today differently from before new media entered the information market. Societal habits have changed as the reception and processing of information have been affected. Though individuals are less likely to participate in groups, "they have gained greater command of their own information environments, often participating in multiple, fluid social networks oriented to self-expression, generally organized around lifestyles." Lance Bennett and the one-step flow of communication shows that communicators substitute their own audience selection with what was "formerly assigned to peer group interaction." This notion delineates the transitional period of two communication eras, where people are paradoxically more isolated and vastly more interconnected at the same time. "(…) It appears that the chosen emphasis is more toward the stealthy technologies that isolate individuals than toward transparent networking technologies that may unite citizens in common cause." The "water cooler effect" of the two-step flow was a means of assigning messages meaning, leading to the development of opinion dynamics. The one-step flow shatters this dynamic by eliminating the traditional groups that provided cues, bringing in social isolation, communication channel fragmentation, and targeted messages via new technology. The one-step flow portrays a very individualistic participant; someone who no longer participates in groups, but rather finds fluid networks where they can control their information reception, voice their opinions, and dictate what parts of their lifestyle they would like share.

Taking into account the new media environment, Bruce Bimber shows that the lowered costs of information and increased supply does not make citizens "better informed in a rational or objective sense. (…) Citizens acquire and learn information in ways that are biased toward reinforcing previously held beliefs and mental constructs." Bimber takes into account the one-step flow information environment, but shows what conditions are needed to increase or foster participation and engagement. Group identification has declined, according to the first model, and attention to message content is harder to buy in this environment. Bimber suggests that while this may be true, the ability to find groups that were previously impossible catalyze motivation to participate in them as people are becoming increasingly able to shape the groups they belong to.

The gap between intention and action is widened due to the low cost of aggregating information. This also allows for "the formalization of sharing among people tracking a particular subject." Clay Shirky takes the idea of facilitated collective action one step further than most, and analyses its effect on the individual and the group, and therefore on a culture itself. He shows through various examples, such as Flickr and other interactive bases, that the new proficiency to disseminate information "changes group awareness," but is increased in its potency by a change in collective action. "Revolution doesn’t happen when society adopts new technologies- it happens when society adopts new behaviors." This means that cooperating is harder than sharing because it involves changing the way one behaves in order to synchronize.

=== Framing in advocacy and contentious politics ===
One of the most important devices used by activists in social movements, transnational advocacy networks, and other realms of contentious politics is the framing of issues and causes in ways that appeal to potential collaborators and targets. According to Tarrow, collective action frames simplify and condense the external environment by selectively emphasizing and highlighting the gravity of social conditions or reinterpreting conditions and behaviors that were previously seen as tolerable as harmful or unjust Framing in advocacy is most successful when it follows a set of rules: "identify an injustice, attribute the responsibility for it to others, and propose solutions to it". This task is particularly challenging in transnational advocacy because it requires appealing to the values, beliefs and ideologies of multiple countries and cultures at once, leading many activist groups to use general, overarching frames that encapsulate universal values.

A number of common types of frames have been employed successfully in activism, particularly injustice and emotionality frames, as Tarrow describes in detail, and frames that deal with human rights, as discussed by Keck and Sikkink; the latter suggest that the most common issue characteristics in which to frame collective action are issues involving bodily harm to vulnerable individuals and issues involving denial of legal equality of opportunity. In their work on transnational advocacy networks, Keck and Sikkink identify successful use of both of these issue characteristic frames, including the re-framing of female circumcision in Kenya, which had previously been regarded as a cultural ritual and rite of passage, to focus on the more violent and visceral term "female genital mutilation".

As Tarrow and Keck and Sikkink describe the importance of framing to attract diverse sets of people to support collective action for a certain issue, Bennett describes "metaframes" - more broad, relaxed framing devices in which diverse groups of advocates can package their particular issue of choice allowing them to support movements larger than just that specific issue, whether it be "diversity, inclusiveness" or "social justice" Though this sort of loose framing may result in the type of "purposeful misunderstandings" witnessed among members of an anti-Iraq war protest in Washington, D.C., Bennett believes that metaframing addresses the problem many previous social movements have had when "common framing (frame bridging) has been a common source of tensions and fragmentation". By creating larger, less ideological sets of frames, various groups with diverse interests are better able to package their issues within those sets.

In later work, Bennett and Segerberg transform this idea of metaframes into what they simultaneously call "memes" and "personalized action frames". No matter which phrase is used, these are symbolic packets of information that are shared among individuals and groups with different interests because it is "easy to imitate, adapt personally, and share broadly". These "memes" or "political action frames" therefore become adaptable "network building and bridging units of social information."

According to Castells, framing, which uses communication to shape people's minds and how they construct meaning, is a crucial tool for activists and groups who want to build power. He presents a detailed argument for framing's particular importance in today's rapidly advancing technological environment: "Because communication, and particularly socialized communication, the one that exists in the public realm, provides the support for the social production of meaning, the battle of the human mind is largely played out in the processes of communication. And this is more so in the network society, characterized by the pervasiveness of communication networks in a multimodal hypertext. Indeed, the ongoing transformation of communication technology in the digital age extends the reach of communication media to all domains of social life in a network that is at the same time global and local, generic and customized in an ever-changing pattern. As a result, power relations…as well as the processes challenging institutionalized power relations are increasingly shaped and decided in the communication field."

As communicators and activists continue to gain access to advanced technological tools, these technologies may be used to disseminate messages and facilitate the organization of movements on a broader scale.

=== Development theory in networked advocacy ===
Much of what has been discussed about new technologies and its influence on collective action in a global public sphere refers mainly to developed countries and social classes that have these technologies readily available to them; media systems and social technologies in the developing world have yet to experience much of this phenomenon. Collin Sparks has organized a chronology of development communication theory that explains the limits and changes in a more global sense, rather than a simple developed-global sense. Sparks takes a survey of development communication theory from three failed paradigms to modernity. Changing social structures in his analysis meant not only the stratification of distribution between rural and urban, but also of the distribution of mass media and development information in rural areas. Economic development was therefore paramount in the acceptance of the development message, rather than the other way around. (45) Following the failure of this paradigm came a continuity variant. This new approach to the dominant paradigm meant minimal adjustments to the goals and methods, but a need for the modern expert to understand the world of non-modern object of the communication strategy. The participatory paradigm, arising later, was a radical shift. There "was no self-evident category of modernity, whether embodied in a western society or elsewhere, and therefore no single goal towards which every nation should aspire: ‘development is not a series of known steps through which each country passes towards pre-defined goals.’" It stressed industrialization and urbanization as stepping-stones, and that societies were likely to have different trajectories and their own normative goals and standards. This meant most importantly that there was no universal development model, needs were based on those of the local community, and vertical communication replaced horizontal communication.

Manuel Castells argues that the public sphere is the most important part of sociopolitical organization because it is where people can articulate their views; when this is done in an organized fashion, a civil society is created as well as a democracy. "The diversity of values in contemporary societies, and their proponents’ passion for them, mean that staid debate signals either an issue's triviality- or the subtly workings of hegemonic power." In this, there "exist problems with deliberative democracy theory both empirically and normatively." The political spectacle, soaked in vagaries and trivialities, has moved from a national scale to a global scale, leaving its residue as far as it can reach. In this fight for relevance, group dominance, and political power, "(…) there is a public sphere in the international arena. It exists within the political/institutional space that is not subject to any particular sovereign power, but, instead, is shaped by the variable geometry of relationships between states and global non-state actors." <Manuel Castells> This is to say that state power, once the only power, faces unprecedented challenges not only from global actors, but from global problems created by a global political spectacle in which any one group can help create. This global civil society is not necessarily civil. The groups that have the power to stir public debate, even though their access to the global public sphere makes them almost elite, are not traditional elites. This is to say that those with access become empowered groups, charged with tools for relevance and distribution of messages to a global audience even if the issue was once national. The political spectacle once controlled by state elites has been opened to those who can compete and adapt to a new media controlled by a new global elite.

Complex global networks carry and re-frame ideas, insert them in policy debates, pressure for regime formation, and enforce existing international norms and rules, at the same time that they try to influence particular domestic political issues. <Keck> As Shirky, Sandler, and countless other political scientists conclude, Keck concludes that although transnational organization, or organization in general, is difficult, trans-cultural resonance and high value in transnational problems gives rise to global collective action within advocacy networks. Traditionally, the media was what organized the civil society's wishes in the public sphere, expressing its desires to influence the state. This means that digital communication networks form our public sphere. <Castells> "However, if the concept of the public sphere has heuristic value, it is because it is inseparable from two other key dimensions of the institutional construction of modern societies: civil society and the state. The public sphere is not just the media or the sociospatial sites of public interaction. It is the cultural/informational repository of the ideas and projects that feed public debate." If there is a problem in the components of communication, a "crisis of legitimacy" occurs because the society's wishes are not being directed to authority, and "citizens to not recognize themselves in the institutions of society." This compromises the power structure. The state's inability to construct a political spectacle that fuels debate in the direction a state wishes causes this crisis of legitimacy. If a state's sovereignty or inherent perception of power is undermined, the public sphere turns somewhere else. When considering the arrival of a transnational public sphere, the need for a sovereign power ceases, and is shaped instead "by the variable geometry of relationships between states and global non-state actors."

=== Power law distributions and the long tail of political organizing ===
An example power law graph, being used to demonstrate ranking of popularity. To the right is the head, or the popular hits; to the left is the long tail, where niches are noticed, but only by a few (also known as the 80-20 rule).

Modern technology, especially cellular telephony and the Internet, have made it much easier for people to find one another. Search engines, like Google, allow people to find any niche interest or group online within seconds. This is a very important development for networked advocacy because it means that those groups and interests that have traditionally been unable to overcome the transaction costs associated with traditional organizations are now able to organize cheaply and selectively online. The implication for politics is evident: people with shared interests or grievances can overcome distance and cost to share their ideas. Organizing in order to advocate a political belief happens quite fluidly online. Online networks support a long tail of political sentiments: a distribution where the minority can connect and organize advocacy.

A power law distribution is a special type of mathematical distribution which can model the distribution of many real world phenomena. The Italian economist Vilfredo Pareto observed in 1906 that 80% of the land in Italy was owned by 20% of the population and thus land ownership in Italy followed a power law distribution. The same is true today, with 20% of the population holding 80% of the wealth. Chris Anderson, in his book The Long Tail, applies Pareto's observation to different aspects of the modern entertainment distribution economy. The low cost of doing business online has allowed the business models of Amazon.com and Netflix to profit from the long tail of the entertainment power law distribution. It can be profitable by aggregating the small niche markets in the tail, which can add up to be as equally profitable as the hits in the head of the curve. The Internet's low cost of entry has reduced the barriers to organizing and increased the viability of operating in the long tail of a power law distribution.

The ability for niche interests to gain a small but passionate following because of the low costs of online organizing mean that the costs for organizing any sort of collective action have fallen as well. Lance Bennett and Jarol Manheim have argued that because the modern media environment is so fragmented, the two-step flow of communication model presented by Paul Lazarsfeld et al. in 1944 has become a one-step flow. Corporate and political organizations can now target messages specifically to hundreds of niche groups. On the one hand, this means that people may be more susceptible to manipulation because of the vast amounts of data available on people's niche interests. However, this also means that a committed group of people can more easily organize and communicate with each other about a specific cause or issue without the mediating influence of mainstream media and the costs associate with organizing offline.

Matthew Hindman offers a critique of the long tail hypothesis, noting that very few blogs and news sources account for the vast majority of online readers. Bloggers also tend to be more educated, white and male than the population in general and the population of traditional media journalists and opinion writers. The discoverability of niche interests has increased because of the Internet, but political discourse is still driven by the head of the power law distribution. Hindman's critique places emphasis on the total number of readers of online political content but does not take into account how passionately those readers are engaging with the content. This stands in sharp contrast to the more optimistic work of Anderson, who interprets the purpose of electronic power law distributions as providing "unlimited shelf space" to products of ideas. Hindman only considers the head of a power law distribution, while Anderson considers the potential for all segments of the tail to equally serve the interests of a variety of consumer - under Anderson's logic, the most powerful item in a power law distribution may not be of use to a potential customer, driving that customer further down the tail distribution to websites more likely to cater to the browser's specific interest. Hindman's corollary to Anderson, focusing solely on political discourse in an electronic space, fails to account for the individuality of consumer taste among a diverse and free-choosing population, a phenomenon originally observed in its electronic state by Clay Shirky.

Like Hindman, Clay Shirky also focuses his attention on the head of the curve, looking at the blogosphere. Shirky finds a power law distribution within the blogosphere, with a preference premium to those sites within the head of the distribution curve. This system of premium linkage, where blogs of high viewership link to other blogs, capturing a larger audience and creating an inequality among the blogosphere. Within a system of abundance, there is diversity and freedom of choice, thus creating inequality. Newcomers to the blogosphere enter an environment shaped by earlier viewers. "Though there are more new bloggers and more new readers every day, most of the new readers are adding to the traffic of the top few blogs, while most new blogs are getting below average traffic, a gap that will grow as the weblog world does." Although the system is still young, Shirky believes that's as of now the inequality within the blogosphere is fair. In the future, the nature of the blogosphere in the head and tail will change. Those in the head, with high viewership and linkage, will be considered mainstream media because the author is simply broadcasting their ideas, not participating actively in conversations. Within the long tail, these active conversations will thrive, yet audience size will remain below average.

=== Electronic networks and advocacy ===
Bruce Bimber argues that there has been a transformation in collective action and electronic networks in the last two decades. There are new approaches to the way people are being organized and there has been an increase in organizational fecundity. This includes traditional organizations, as well as an uprising in organization-less advocacy. Today's media environment, according to Bimber, is one of "information abundance, " in which information is easily produced by nearly anyone, widely distributed and either cheap or free. The cost of information and the transaction costs associated are much lower due to the availability and manageability of information. By having an easily accessible avenue to self-actualize as well as identify personal interests people can seize the opportunity to participate in a larger movement. As Bimber correctly identified, political scientists generally fail to understand motivation behind action, rather are best able to identify opportunities to pique interests. The combination of social media and one- step communication significantly advances this methodology. In Bimber's quadrant, the new wave of self-actualization takes the user to the far left of the ‘X axis’ and maximizes on Personal Interaction. But what is intriguing is that there is not an effective barometer—within Bimber's framework—to properly identify the user as achieving both Entrepreneurial and Institutional Engagement, as modeled on the ‘Y axis’. However, in the new era, they are not mutually exclusive. One can both be interacting to seek out a personal interest or gain, while simultaneously being part of a collective. The rapid changes that have swept across the Middle East provide an ideal case study as to how Personal Interaction, Institutional Engagement and Entrepreneurial Engagement can now be interwoven within each other.

In understanding the way that electronic networks and advocacy interact, Steven Livingston has proposed a framework by which to visualize where states lie in their ability and resources. In Livingston's theoretical model, states fall within four distinct quadrants of consolidated statehood and information/collaboration costs.

Further defining these quadrants, Livingston explains that Quadrant 1 (Consolidated statehood/High info. costs) "relies on extant collaborative organizations." He continues, explaining that it is "a historical condition and a politically advantageous condition" – some regimes seek more collaboration only for sanctioned activities and only on a level that the government approves of. However, the ability of technology to facilitate collaboration across broad populations is easily applied to fight against these institutions and their restrictions.

The four quadrants postulated by Livingston are defined as follows, with the works/theories of authors that correspond to each one:

- Quadrant 1 (High Information/Collaboration Costs, Consolidated Statehood): Tarrow, Tilly, McCarthy & Zald, Keck & Sikkink, others in classic collective action theory.
- Quadrant 2 (Low Information/Collaboration Costs, Consolidated Statehood): Castells, Bimber, Bennett & Segerberg, Earl & Kimport, Shirky, others in new collective action theory.
- Quadrant 3 (Low Information/Collaboration Costs, Limited Statehood): Livingston & Walterdrop, others researching new areas in which ICT is used to acquire public goods and advance collective action when the state cannot or will not.
- Quadrant 4 (High Information/Collaboration Costs, Limited Statehood): Theories/strategies similar to those traditionally applied by the World Bank in their development efforts.

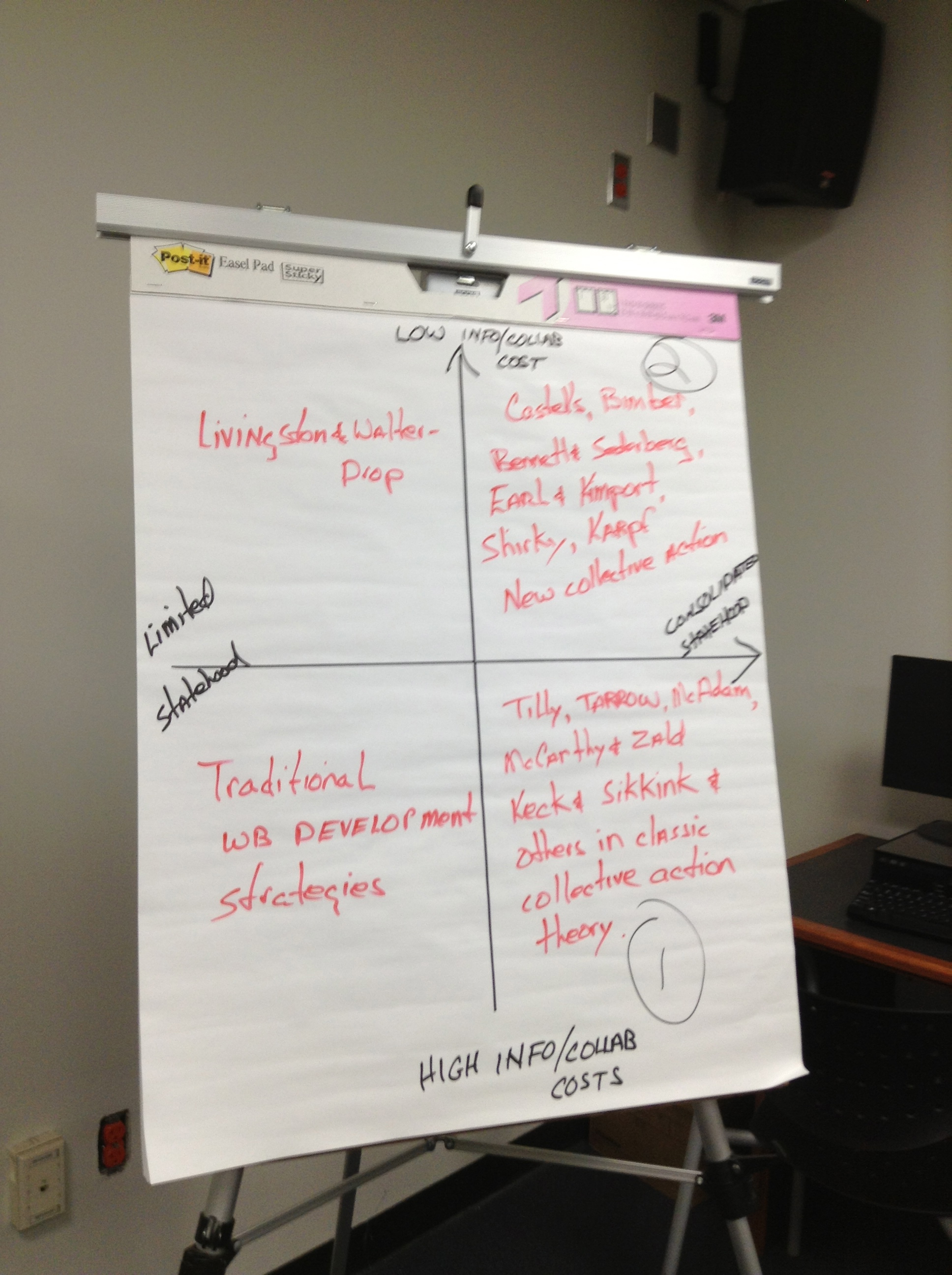
Quadrants define countries along axes of limited or consolidated statehood and high or low information/collaboration costs. The x-axis defines a range of limited to consolidated statehood and the y-axis establishes a range of low to high information/collaboration costs.

Livingston and Kinkforth argue that information and communication technology (ICT) has already affected transnational advocacy in two significant ways:

1. Advocacy amplification: New technologies have made it easier for existing transnational advocacy networks to gather, monitor and frame information about issues, as well as to marshal the expertise of other groups in their network. The microelectronics revolution has created new opportunities for global networked advocacy by expanding both the number of globally networked nongovernmental organizations and social movements, as well as by allowing individuals to link together in social networks such as Twitter and Facebook.
2. Creating entirely new forms of advocacy: New technologies have enabled new types of advocacy and organization. This is especially true in regions of the world that have limited state governance.

Jennifer Earl and Katrina Kimport, whose digital advocacy research suggests that organizations can be completely unnecessary for collective action in some cases of online activism, propose similar ideas. They suggest that modern social movements exist on a continuum of online activism. The "poles" of this continuum are "e-mobilizations," which "use online tools to bring people into the streets for face-to-face protests," and "e-movements," which emerge and thrive entirely online, and between the two poles exist "e-tactics," in which activists may use both online and off-line components to facilitate movements. They cite the strategic voting e-movement of 2000, in which a small group of websites run by individuals and small groups paired voters from different states in ways that both influenced the presidential election and allowed voters to adhere to their political beliefs, as an example of organizing without organizations. Additionally, they reject Bimber, Flanigan, and Stohl's use of the term "organizational fecundity" to the wide variety of organizing forms used to facilitate collective action in favor of more open "organizing fecundity," which suggests that "the process itself is being opened up, not just the variety of units that participate in it."

For all the discussion of E-tactics by Earl & Kimport it seems easy to suggest that what it is really being described here is a situation of "what’s old is new again," but this time active in a digital space. The authors point to historical uses of petitions, boycotts and letter-writing campaigns that were used to spark social movement campaigns to advocate for farm workers, civil rights, all to varying degrees of success. The description of how these forms of protest translate into "E-tactics" in an online environment, like with "warehouse" and "non-warehouse" petition sites do not seem to be a radically new design of how to engage in protest or collective action.

An important question that has been addressed in recent advocacy research is whether today's activists are using a new repertoire of contention or merely incorporating technological tools and advancements into the set of strategies and perspectives they have used in the past. Earl and Kimport, in concepts similar to those in Livingston and Kinkforth's work, give names to the two schools of thought on the question: the supersize model, which "does not find that ICT usage in any way changes the processes of activism, although it changes the scale on which activism takes place [and] augments—or supersizes—the processes of activism we already understand," and theory 2.0, which "suggests that scholars may need to change their theoretical models of how organizing and participation take place to fully understand and describe Web activism [and that] the engine driving protest would l ook and operate differently than it has before."

A 2006 Risse and Lehmkuhl paper suggests that by supplanting would-be government structures in failed states with different modes of governance that approach tends to leave more questions than answers. They suggest that organizations should not necessarily concern themselves with replicating state-centered solutions for areas of limited statehood that focus on "conventional instruments of a state monopoly," (Risse & Lehmkhul, p. 11, 2006.) New modes of governance in areas of limited statehood, then, represent an arena of some uncharted waters where new approaches and ideas must be put forth. A new starting point, outside the typical functions and understanding, of how governance and collective action is used to provide for critical needs like public safety, clean water and health care, for example.

One such new approach involves ICTs and builds on the literature discussed early that considered how ICTs could be used to achieve advocacy and collective action goals in the context of a consolidated state. In their paper, "Information and Communication Technologies in Areas of Limited Statehood (2012), Livingston and Walter-Drop consider how ICTs can be used as a modes of governance to provide goods, protection or the enforcement of political decisions when states are incapable or hindered in ability to do so. The authors write that, "failing statehood does not necessarily translate to the absence of governance," suggesting that surely something like ICTs could be used to fill the void of service delivery, (Livingston & Walter-Drop, p. 7, 2012.)

The authors make their case by pointing to prior cases where ICTs have been used in the developed world, with a chief focus on mobile telephony, given the reach and availability of the technology. They also highlight a variety of "innovation centers" and ICT projects in Africa, like Ushahidi, for example, to illustrate a sort-of ground floor of where innovation is happening now, (Livingston & Walter-Drop, 2012.) A more concrete example is the Satellite Sentinel Project that uses remote sensing satellites to provide a public service. In this case, the service is monitoring human rights violation in the Sudan, a place of limited statehood. The group using the technology is a non-state actor, using the satellite images to have visual access to places in the Sudan that are considered inaccessible because of a lack of road infrastructure. Livingston and Walter-Drop refer to this visibility provided by satellites as a new form of governance (Livingston & Walter-Drop, p. 9, 2012.)

== The significance of electronic networks ==
The advent of digital communication tools and media has introduced the possibility that the nature of the social ties discussed above has been radically altered. Whereas these ties were traditionally developed through face to face interaction, some argue that equally relevant relationships can be developed over electronic networks, including email, Skype, or Twitter. Clay Shirky represents thinkers who believe that such connections can be- and are being- created using new technologies, as exemplified by his book Here Comes Everybody. Others, such as Malcolm Gladwell and Evgeny Morozov, take issue with the notion that the ties formed electronically are "strong" enough to matter in terms of advocacy. This issue remains a contested one.

=== The relationship between offline and online action in advocacy ===
Tarrow displays skepticism at the notion that digital ties and communication can overcome interpersonal trust and ties. He argues "loose mobilizing structures have defects in their virtues (149)." If the Internet can only produce weak, diffuse ties, Tarrow concludes that social movements still require organizations that work out of an identifiable, physical space. Keck and Sikkink echo this misgiving about the diffuse ties digital technology cultivates, maintaining "networks are more effective when they are strong and dense (206)." However, the rapid expansion of information and communication technologies (ICTs) prompts a reevaluation of the traditional understandings of collective action models provided by Olson, Tarrow, and Keck and Sikkink.

W. Lance Bennett also highlights the agility provided by technology in his exploration of digital social movements. Bennett interprets ideas of transnational advocacy developed by Keck & Sikkink and places them in the context of a world with low information costs, and high state consolidation. "Large-scale transnational activism, framed loosely around social justice issues, has displayed remarkable organizational capacities in recent years to wage sustained protests against corporations and transnational organizations at the core of global economic trade and development." Bennett observes that in the digital age, transnational protests have begun to exhibit a movement toward (1) inclusive organization models, (2) social technologies that allow for decentralized, networked activism, and (3) the leveraging of political capabilities of network members to form effective relationships with targets. Inclusive organization models allow organizations greater fluid movement between issues and targets without being restrained by limited ideologies that restrict collaboration. The ability to easily slide between issues leads to a proliferation of multi-issue campaigns and allegiances with different kinds of campaign organizations and groups. The utilization of social technologies combines online and offline relationships to establish trust, credibility and loyalty among participants at the individual level.

Much in line with Tarrow and Keck and Sikkink, Bennett recognizes the importance of personal relationships for social movements. However, instead of dismissing digital ties as weak, Bennett stresses the need for integrated on- and offline relationships. "Technology is often aimed at getting people together offline, and one purpose of offline associations is to clarify and motivate online relations (217)." This distinction highlights an important aspect of digital advocacy—the technologies themselves are not organizing movements. They simply facilitate and augment the interpersonal relations that make up the core of social action networks. Different kinds of advocacy networks interact with technology differently. Bennett describes "hyper-organizations" as a form of advocacy existing solely in the digital domain. These organizations act without the kind of physical space that Olson (1965) and Tarrow associated with models of advocacy organizations. What Bennett may fail to fully appreciate is that the flexible identities and consumerist ideas about advocacy and politics may only hold true for the Global North. Outside of developed regions, the stakes may be higher and the "luxury of relative indifference" may not exist.

Expanding upon the idea of the hyper-organization, Bennett and Segerberg explore how loosely tied organizations born out of digital technologies pair with traditional hierarchical organizations. Collaborations between digitally enabled movements and traditional advocacy networks effectively enhance the ability for both organizations to pursue collective action.

"Classic social movement activities based on collective identifications and strongly tied networks continue to play a role in this political landscape, but they have become joined, interspersed, and in some cases supplanted by personalized collective action formations in which digital media become integral organizational parts (46)."

The creation of hybrid coalitions provide legitimacy and grounding for fluid digital advocacy organizations and agility for more traditional organizations. Prior to the emergence of digital technology, advocacy groups organized through interpersonal networks, and tools like flyers, posters, billboards. Each of these mechanisms for information sharing tend to require the resources of the kinds of hierarchal organizations Tarrow recognized as critical to collective action. With technology, movements expand more quickly and at a lower cost. Earl and Kimport argue, "truly meaningful collaboration—the power of collective action—can be created and facilitated without copresence for protest (126)." Technology allows what Earl and Kimport refer to as supersizing, or the use of online tactics to create or organize physical offline action. Manuel Castells provides an example of supersizing in his discussion of the Tunisian revolution,

"The connection between free communication on Facebook, YouTube, and Twitter and the occupation of urban space created a hybrid public space of freedom that became a major feature of the Tunisian rebellion (23)." Castells highlights how digital technology creates both a tool and a space for stressed, repressed, and angry communities to connect with one another. Once individuals in an online community recognize and discover their common emotions, Castells points to the occupation of urban spaces as the next step for action. According to Castells, the Internet creates the possibility a ‘space of autonomy’—a hybrid of cyberspace and urban space in which information can be exchanges to share feelings of collective hope or outrage. While Castells calls these spaces of autonomy, "the new spatial form of networked social movements (222)," Earl and Kimport also recognize a level of digital activism that exceeds this kind of supersized action.

Theory 2.0 suggests that the use of digital technologies changes the underlying processes of advocacy. In particular, the theory holds that collective action can exist without copresence, or with limited copresence (127). In the past, the collective understanding of advocacy was limited by institutional and contextual questions. Today, advocacy may mean finding patterns in data—perhaps, a new conception of framing in which words take a back seat to data to tell a story, or algorithms define the patterns of things that exist in the world. As Bimber noted, digital technology has changed the entire structure and understanding of information. However, like the information revolutions past, these changes may not completely overcome the institutions of the past. The collective action theories of Olson, Tarrow, and Keck and Sikkink retain important conceptual principles to guide the understanding of advocacy networks. Technology has simply thrown off the constraints posed by collaboration and information costs, raising broader, deeper, complex questions about what advocacy means, how it can be achieved, and from whence it stems.

=== Electronic networks in free and open-source software ===
The concept of free software is much older than the Free Software Movement or the free software community, it is generally distinguished from the more popular open source software by its philosophical definition. Free software is generally referred to as "free speech," not "free beer." Essentially, those who are in favor of free software are in favor of freely accessing, reading, modifying, and redistributing the software. In the 1970s and 80's, two versions of Unix were being distributed from AT&T and Berkeley Software Distribution (BSD), and the model favored by AT&T tended to receive more downloads than the BSD model. Several commercial innovations occurred because of these developments, including Apple's macOS. This was indicative of a movement within commercial software development to earn more profit from their products. Many argue that in 1976, Bill Gates signaled the beginning of the software-for-pay business with his Open Letter to Hobbyists, which referred to those people tinkering with the Altair BASIC system, which he developed with Paul Allen, criminals and guilty of copyright infringement. In response, Richard Stallman founded the Free Software Movement to ensure that either Unix or the alternate which he developed, GNU, would be free for people to use and develop on their own. This does not mean, however, that revised versions of free software can not be obfuscated or used in commercially sold products.

Open source software is similar in its mission, but the major difference is that there is no obfuscation allowed for any part of a code which is based on open source software and that no open source software can be used as a commercially sold product. The most famous open source code is the Linux operating system, which is used and distributed both non-commercially and commercially (not sold). Free and open source software, however, are not in competition with each other. Linux and GNU, including other open source or free software such as MINIX, are often used in combination in original software development.

Wikipedia, otherwise known as the free encyclopedia, is free because it follows the mantra of free software as defined by Richard Stallman. Collaborations such as Wikipedia, the free software movement, and open source software are successful in that they take advantage of small contributions by many people and that the cost of failure is low. The model of free or open source software may be one of the older forms of electronically enabled networks, but its format has remained relatively unchanged since the early 1990s. Networked advocacy in free and open source software movements is specifically designed to maintain an open flow of communication and development alive between those interested in various software projects. They take advantage of the soft ties between people of common interests and varying levels of skill to come together to create software which is at times effective and cheap enough to be a better choice for governments and business than commercially developed software products.

=== Electronic networks and politics ===
It is vital that citizens have the training to utilize new technology to disseminate information, decentralize local governance and hold their government accountable; these tools ultimately bring the government closer to the people by strengthening citizens’ political voices to engage their government to ensure improved quality and transparency. Recent events in the Middle East and North Africa are evidence of the power of collective mobilization and how new technologies can be implemented to inspire individuals and communities to act.

Turning to specific recent events, some cite the 2009–2010 Iranian election protests and Tunisia's Jasmine Revolution as examples of the power of online technology to aid social advocacy and protest. Other critics doubt its impact, saying instead that grievances mobilize people, not technology. In a January 2011 article for Foreign Policy, commentator Ethan Zuckerman gave social networking technology some credit, but argued that the sustained nature of the revolts, as well as the solidarity shown between the revolts of different nations, is a phenomenon beyond the scope of online networked advocacy.

While the Middle East revolutions garnered attention for the ability for grassroots organizations to launch, social media platforms can also effectively be mobilized for a top down organization as well. As Congress debated the merits of funding for Planned Parenthood, the organization was able to utilize Facebook and Twitter to educate people about the effects of a funding reduction. What was so stunningly effective was that most people who participated in the online educational campaign were not originally "fans" of Planned Parenthood's Facebook page, but rather were influenced—to use Bennett and Manheim's word—by seeing a peer's Facebook posting. Each reposting helped spread information and the campaign went "viral".

Viral marketing relies heavily on networked communications, whether Internet bulletin board systems (BBS), chat rooms or social media services like Twitter and Facebook. At the foundational level, viral marketing entails producing a large media outcome with limited resource input, in effect turning the Hindman model of power law distribution on its head by allowing a new website or idea to rise quickly up the rankings of a power law distributed network. Direct action by the viral marketing production team is only involved at the beginning of a project, and relies extensively on demonstrated networking phenomena to spread news or information about a product to a wider base. Among the first to write about viral marketing on the Internet was the media critic Douglas Rushkoff. The assumption is that if such an advertisement reaches a "susceptible" user, that user becomes "infected" (i.e., accepts the idea) and shares the idea with others "infecting them," in the viral analogy's terms. As long as each infected user shares the idea with more than one susceptible user on average (i.e., the basic reproductive rate is greater than one—the standard in epidemiology for qualifying something as an epidemic), the number of infected users grows according to an exponential curve. Of course, the marketing campaign may be successful even if the message spreads more slowly, if this user-to-user sharing is sustained by other forms of marketing communications, such as public relations or advertising. This is substantially similar to a modified one-step flow theory outlined by Jarol B. Manheim and W. Lance Bennett, with substantial additions designed to turn the theory into a direct-marketing strategy.

Those who see the Internet as having played a crucial role believe ICT reinforced portions of theoretical concepts behind networked advocacy in protests in Egypt, Bahrain, Yemen and Iran. For instance, the self-repairing nature of networks connected to outside information centers is notable. Despite Egyptian government attempts to block Internet access and reduce the organizing and communicative potential of social networking websites, Egyptian protesters effectively expanded the sphere of their complaint to capture the attention of the Western and world media, including Google, which offered technology to circumvent the Internet shutdown. These peripheral technologies included posting status updates and event information via phone using a novel new "Text-to-Tweet" program. In addition, The Egyptian appeal to private businesses and Western governments is an example of the networked advocacy "Boomerang Effect," described as early as 1984 by Millard F. Mann of the University of Kansas but popularized in the work Activists Beyond Borders by communications experts Margaret Keck and Kathryn Sikkink.

There is also a compelling link between the ready availability of information provided by Internet websites such as Twitter and the speed with which organized, concerted protests spread across national borders. Networked advocacy tools such as Facebook and Twitter appear to have played a role in coalescing the horizontally structured Egyptian Revolution of 2011. It is possible that older technologies, such as cable television, played an equally large role in fomenting and sustaining protests.

On the other hand, other critics caution against overstating the role of electronic advocacy in the Middle East protests. Criticisms include:

- Shared grievances, coupled with strong solidarity—not technology—cause protest.
- Online protests have low entry barriers, but they also have exceptionally low commitment levels, hence there is a constant danger of overestimating the degree of support a particular cause enjoys.
- Internet penetration, and use of platforms like Twitter and Facebook is low in much of the developing world, thus these protests are more likely to reach elite or developed countries rather than large masses of poor people around the world.
- Malcolm Gladwell argues that social media-driven activism favors weak-tie connections that only give information as opposed to strong-tie personal connections that help people persevere in the face of danger.

=== Networked advocacy in areas of limited statehood and the Global South ===
Much of the available scholarship on networked advocacy deals with areas of the world in which states are consolidated. Such states are willing and able to provide basic public goods. People who hope to enact political change in such places direct their advocacy toward the state. This literature relies on the assumption that advocates have a state on which it can direct political pressure. But this work excludes situations in which statehood is limited or where not much of a state exists at all. Areas of limited statehood do not have to necessarily refer to a state's entire geographic area but could be confined to certain regions.

Mancur Olson sees the state as the pinnacle of a large organization. In the first pages of The Logic of Collective Action, he explains that the state—like the other organizations on which he focuses his study—is "expected to further the interests of its citizens." He invites no possibility of organizing in a non-state environment.

Similarly, the modes of governance Sidney Tarrow discusses in Power in Movement rely on the centrality of the state. He characterizes contentious politics—his iteration of collective action—as "not only…the expression of societies’ submerged groups putting pressure on the state, but as an intermediary set of processes between states and societies." For Tarrow, the state is a necessary condition, the arena in which advocacy happens. In the state’s absence, contentious politics are just local protests. But what of the "submerged groups" that exist in an area of limited statehood?

While Keck and Sikkink mention some areas of limited statehood in the case studies presented in Activists Beyond Borders, their theory of collective action still focuses primarily on the interaction between nation states and non-state actors. Their boomerang model addresses the idea of an uncooperative government, positioning NGOs as interlocuters between specific a population and its state. However, in the absence of a central government, how would this model change?

In "Social Movements beyond Borders," Lance Bennett's examination of political capacity also seems to assume the existence of a state. In examining the flexible, fluid networks facilitated by a digital information environment, he asks whether these networks in particular are able "to influence larger publics and establish effective political relationships with the targets of their protest." Bennett's examples of social movements all involve protests against concrete targets inseparable from the state. But what happens in an area of limited statehood, when establishing relationships with targets—or perhaps even having targets at all—is not an option?

Castells overtly discusses the centrality of the state in his theory of collective action. As noted before, Castells sees collective action and social movements as struggles between power and counterpower. He discusses these power dynamics exclusively in terms of the state: "Power relations are imbedded in the institutions of society, and particularly in the state…The actual configuration of the state and other institutions that regulate people’s lives depend on the constant interaction between power and counterpower." He even goes as far as to say that in order for power networks—and, by extension, social movements—to function, a state must exist. In his words, "the state constitutes the default network for the proper functioning of all other networks." With this assertion, he seems to doom all areas of limited statehood to powerlessness when it comes to mobilizing their outrage and engaging in collective action.

By presupposing a "global north" society, Earl and Kimport also limit their vision when it comes to the potential of digitally enabled collective action. Though they never assert it explicitly, their theories seem to rely on the existence of a consolidated state. Nearly all of the examples of e-tactics they offer are online petitions; what they neglect to take into account is that some states are not open to being persuaded by petitions. Furthermore, their characterization of "theory 2.0" only takes into account a very narrow range of collective action possibilities and forms. They hypothesize that "theory 2.0" will create an environment conducive to a "wide" range of protest areas, including "saving television shows, supporting boy bands and challenging corporate game producers." Not only are these examples exclusive to the "global north," but they also ignore the potential of "theory 2.0" to allow for mechanisms that empower marginalized populations in areas of limited statehood, such as Reclaim Naija or Ushahidi.

Steven Livingston and Gregor Walter-Drop argue that not just new technology but new uses of information and communication technology can fill the void left by dysfunctional, extractive states. Daron Acemoglu and James Robinson's Why Nations Fail distinguishes between extractive and pluralistic nations. The former are designed to benefit and preserve the wealth of an elite. Institutions in these nations extract natural resources for this group and sacrifice the security of the larger population to protect it. Such an environment breeds resentment and unrest, which sets states on the path to instability and ultimately failure. Meanwhile, pluralistic political and economic institutions provide opportunities for economic advancement and protect the hard-won property of citizens. A free press sets pluralistic states apart from extractive ones, holding powerful institutions accountable for their actions. Pluralistic nations also foster participation through a robust civil society.

Event-mapping platforms such as Ushahidi, which relies largely on crowdsourcing, or Syria Tracker have monitored and visually displayed incidences of violence across the world. Such platforms gather information from locals on the ground and turn that data into digital, interactive maps.

M-Pesa, a money-transfer service based on mobile telephony, allows users with limited access to banks to transfer money without ever having to exchange physical currency.

In recent years, new technological tools and increased access to information have combined to enable substantial growth in activism efforts in Latin American regions of the Global South. Google technologies—particularly Google Street View and Google Earth Engine, an online environment monitoring tool updated daily—have proven transformative for several groups, including the Amazon Conservation Team and the Surui tribe, in measuring and mapping the Amazon region in order to aid protection of the rainforest and isolated indigenous groups. After Guatemala's 36-year civil war ended in 1996, "the country was a vast unmarked grave" with more than 200,000 people missing or dead as a result of the conflict, and, following the war, the government, army, and other official groups maintained silence about victims’ identities and hid important information about the crimes committed during the war. Over the past several years, however, human rights groups and investigators have gained access to a growing body of crucial police and government records and undertaken the analysis and organization of a massive archive of records. They have done this through physically locating, digitally scanning, and storing many of the millions of pages of records, gathering and housing witnesses’ and victims’ experiences in databases, and conducting quantitative analyses of interviews and other knowledge gathered. These records have aided Guatemalan families in learning the whereabouts of missing loved ones and provided evidence in multiple human rights cases.

Livingston and Walter-Drop argue that these tools, while each have the potential to be effective individually, are most powerful when they "come together to empower communities against the harsher aspects of day-to-day life in areas where the government is both weak and corrupt". Crowdsourcing platforms, for example, often combine a number of technologies to provide populations with the tools to report corruption, violence, and other problems and encourage institutional response and rectification; Google's tools combine in similar ways to provide transparency, share information, and facilitate the protection of compromised regions and populations.

=== Electronic networks and event mapping ===
Remote sensing data, geographical information system (GIS) platforms, mobile telephony work together to allow crowdsourcing initiatives that have created new types of organization around the world. One example of this is the event mapping, an advocacy activity that relies on geospatial data collected by commercial remote sensing satellites, GPS coordinates and GIS. One example is Ushahidi, which means "testimony" in Swahili, a GIS platform established in 2008 to monitor and map post-election violence in Kenya. Ushahidi has grown from an ad hoc group of volunteers to a more focused organization not only working in Kenya, but much of Africa, Europe, South America and the United States. Individuals on the ground can establish their own monitoring system and observers from all over the world can monitor elections to look for signs of fraud and/or violence. Other examples of the uses of the Ushahidi platform include organizing resources in post-earthquake Haiti, the Help Map Russia system which coordinates resources to fight wildfires in Russia, and a system for mapping violence and protests in Libya.

One particularly successful campaign using event mapping was a joint collaboration project with Vote Report India and Ushahidi. A citizen-driven election monitoring platform was created in 2009 to report on voting habits and voter turnout. This was intended to be a campaign to increase voter turnout, engagement and awareness by promoting democracy.

Aside from fighting corruption, as seen in Kenya, research has shown that as mobile phone penetration in a community increases, the feeling that society is wholly corrupt decreases. This is likely due to the mobile phone's facilitation of networked information systems that increase access to a broader array of information and allow relatively simple fact-checking. Event mapping, however, can be used in a variety of ways. It can illuminate problems, create communities with common goals, bring attention to injustice, and even redefine the idea of an "international" or "domestic" issue by simply showing the physical location of an event.

Patrick Meier is an internationally renowned expert in the application of new technologies for crisis early warning and humanitarian response. He has demonstrated the success of information and communications technologies in crisis mapping – live maps being updated with information from sources on the ground via SMS technology, email, and social media.

Meier has been successful in aiding humanitarian organizations like the United Nations, the World Health Organization, Amnesty International and other to mobilize social media and digital technology resources to resolve humanitarian crises. According to Meier, "Situational awareness is key to allocating resources and coordinating logistics… Gaining information like this straight from crisis zones is a game changer; these technologies didn’t exist just a few years ago."

Meier, a former director of crisis mapping at Ushahidi, sees the power of ICT's for "democratizing information access, participation, and agency." Meier focuses on the use of crisis mapping in the humanitarian sector by exploring the cases of the aftermath of the Haitian earthquake, forest fires in remote parts of Russia and the humanitarian crisis in Libya. Meier, by examining collective action in the realm of humanitarian disasters, sheds light on what might be a way forward in terms of how ICT can create digitally enabled modes of governance when he recommends a "more decentralized, bottom-up approach."

Perhaps a more robust digitally enabled governance modality will occur when citizens of an area of limited statehood are provided with new information and communication technology and then left on their own to figure out how governance challenges can be "met and responded to locally." Rather than simply relegating locals to simply recorders of governance issues, a new form of governance modality will allow these populations to "make better use of new information technologies to support their immediate self-organized response efforts." Perhaps the key to digitally enabled governance modalities is not simply the introduction of new ICT's to a population, but also the extent to which local populations are allowed to own the technology and its usage for themselves and in doing so develop their own locally melded governance structures.

=== Electronic networks and environmentalism ===
Networked collective action has shown promise for enhancing environmental activism around the globe. One prominent example is the Google Earth Engine, which uses 25 years of satellite images and current data to provide a live model of the earth. The project, posted online for free, is aimed to help developing nations track deforestation rates and other environmental changes in real time. In the US, the nonprofit group Appalachian Voices uses the tool to show the world what mountaintop removal mining has done to their home. In Brazil, the Suruí tribe is using Google Earth Engine to measure the removal of trees from their rainforest by illegal loggers. Through the Suruí Carbon Project, several members of the community were given Android phones that allowed them to calculate the carbon emissions of trees in their forest. Now, when they can monitor their forests for suspicious changes by illegal loggers. Other technologies are also at play in networked activism. IBM offers an iPhone app that allows users to crowdsouce water quality. Called "Creekwatch" it asks users to take a photo of a creek or stream they walk by, then answer the water level, flow and trash level. This water is released publicly, and can allow water boards in cities and countries to monitor and manage water supplies more effectively, prevent leaks in water pipelines and help activists monitor their watersheds.

In India, Neerjaal is a newer project that allows people to crowdsource information about water sources, consumption, harvesting and shortages for use on an interactive platform.

In 2007, the Blue Planet Run Foundation launched Peer Water Exchange, a "unique participatory decision-making network of partners, [which] combines people, process, and technology to manage water and sanitation projects around the world – from application, selection, funding, implementation, and impact assessment.". In the project, communities who apply for funding for water-related projects must provide information about their proposals, which are voted on by other members of the online community. Any group that wants to apply for funding, must agree to evaluate at least 5 other project proposals. Not only does this provide transparency for donors and communities, but it also allows people to come together from communities around the world to share information and best practices.

=== Youth advocacy organizations ===
There are many well-established organizations that support advocacy efforts around issues that affect youth both on national and international levels. Some of these organizations like Youth Advocate Program International, for example, which attempts to educate policy makers about issues as such child slavery and trafficking to help establish protective policies for children, are led by adults who advocate on behalf of children. Others, like the Youth Advocacy Center, work with youth to advocate for themselves. YAC mentors youth who are or about to be in the foster system to advocate for their rights.

But of a more important, related note, there has been a rise in youth advocacy organizations and participation by youth themselves, specifically in the participation and involvement in advocacy efforts and the creation of organizations and projects to support these causes. As suggested by the research mentioned earlier (another CIRCLE supported study found roughly 60 percent of youth said they used social networking to address social issues), youth have become more active participators in civic and political life through the use of digital and social media. One example of this has been the increase in youth participation in advocacy networking sites and organizations like TakingItGlobal] and the Global Youth Action Network.

TakingItGlobal (TIG) is an international social networking site that encourages youth to connect to organizations and their peers for advocacy efforts on international topics that interest them. As of 2011, the network had 340,000 members that included 22,000 nonprofits and 2,400 schools in 118 countries. In addition to connection facilitation, the network also hosts conferences and summits and offers resources for educators and organizations to build capacity and increase scope. TIG works in partnership with the Global Youth Action Network, which serves as the ground level outreach organization for a number of the partner projects. Both TakingItGlobal and the Global Youth Action Network connect directly with many international and national NGOs, as well as other organizations, to increase support for such causes. TIG and GYAN also support projects through organizations like Youth Service America, a U.S. based-nonprofit focused on improving youth participation in national service.

Through efforts using digital and social media, organizations like TIG, GYAN, and YSA, aim to help youth see their potential as stakeholders and global citizens, encourage their participation in national and international issues that are or could be important to them, connect them to their national and international peers who are like-minded to do the same, and expose the availability of resources and organizations they can use to facilitate advocacy and change.

=== Electronic networks and arts exchange ===
There are certain areas of collective action that have always challenged governments–the arts is one area in which government sponsorship traditionally falls short. Often not seen in as high a position of priority as defense, for instance, artistic endeavor and exchange is often faced with coordination challenges for which it has proven difficult to overcome with government funding alone. With electronic networks we see many new ways private institutions and interested individuals have been able make art more accessible to the public worldwide.

Google began making the world's masterpieces more accessible by including The Prado museum and select works in the Google Earth platform. By simply locating The Prado users can zoom in to view up close high definition images of select art works. The high definition images not only allow the user to see a painting clearly, but even allow the user a close enough look to study individual brush strokes on a painting. Google Earth's inclusion of The Prado was just the beginning of applying these kinds of technologies to accessing the arts. In February 2011 Google unveiled Google Art Project, a platform devoted to bringing online museums around the world and their most famous works to the online public. Google Art Project is a platform housing many of the world museums and a variety of works from each location. Users can use this technology to get high definition, close up views of some of the world's most famous paintings, much like in the Google Earth presentation of The Prado. With Google Art Project users can also take virtual tours of certain areas and exhibits of the museums, creating a more realistic visitor experience. This platform allows a person with a computer and an Internet connection in say, Arkansas, can take a virtual, high definition tour of, for instance, the Gemäldegalerie in Berlin, Germany, the National Gallery in London, England, or the Palace of Versailles in Versailles, France. Because of online platforms like Google Earth and Google Arts an area once largely reserved for the wealthy–the arts–because of limited accessibility, is increasingly accessible.

Looking beyond the mainstream, museum-housed art, online networks have enabled access to a wider variety, or long tail of art, whether for display, learning, or purchase. Art.Net, for instance, is a non-profit web-based artist collective of more than 450 artists, poets, musicians, painters, sculptors, animators, hacker artists, and other creative people from around the world, aimed at helping artists share their works on the World Wide Web. Artists create and maintain studio web spaces on the site and gallery pages where they show their works and share information about themselves. Artists are also encouraged to collaborate and to help each other promote and improve their art. Several member artists also teach art in their studio spaces located on Art.Net.

Art.net should not be confused with Artnet, which is an information platform for the international art market, including fine arts, decorative arts and design. It provides services allowing its clients to attain price transparency, giving them an effective overview of the art market and enabling them to contact galleries directly. The network caters specifically to art dealers, as well as buyers. Another online network for collectors is the recently established VIP Art Fair, virtual trade show for buyers and sellers of art. VIP Art Fair gives contemporary art collectors access to artworks by a wide range of artists and the ability to connect one-on-one with internationally renowned dealers anywhere in the world. With electronic networks and online platforms devoted to art becomes more accessible to everyone, whether that means an artist can easily share his or her work and a student or art lover can access a greater variety of works for study or enjoyment online.

== Potential pitfalls of networked advocacy ==
Networked advocacy has great potential to improve lives around the world, but it is also important to recognize the potential risks associated with this form of collective action. In particular, advocacy powered by various forms of Information and communications technology may put participants at risk of reprisal by states or other entities with strong interests in the status quo.

In Seeing Like a State: How Certain Schemes to Improve the Human Condition Have Failed, James C. Scott argues that most consolidations of state power have their roots in efforts to make populations more "legible" to ruling elites. He further argues that these efforts have the ultimate goal of facilitating "taxation, political control, and conscription." Scott argues that efforts at legibility require simplification, which can often lead to loss of useful local knowledge. Ultimately, Scott believes that increased legibility can put citizens at risk of exploitation, and in the worst cases, physical harm.

In terms of standardization, according to Scott measurement practices were one of the most important areas to standardize and eventually out of this standardization emerged the metric system, which was "at once a means of administrative centralization, commercial reform, and cultural progress". To Scott, "the crowning artifact of this mighty simplification is the cadastral map" which was a survey of landholdings used to accurately levy taxes. In broad terms, the cadastral map allowed the state to monitor who owned land where. Scott sees immense and transformative power in maps, especially those created by the state. As with any object of simplification created by the state, maps "are designed to summarize precisely those aspects of a complex world that are of immediate interest to the mapmaker and to ignore the rest." Often states, in order to reflect their own power, will ignore certain areas on maps as is obvious when one searches for the Kibera slum in Nairobi, Kenya which is pictured as a blank area in Google maps. To counter this simplification and reframing of this area by the state, ICT's like OpenStreetMap.org allow for crowdsourced mapping by locals. However, the question must then be considered, by making this area legible does this crowdsourcing also open up the area to domination from the state?

Although Scott was writing before the ICT revolution had taken off, his concerns about legibility are newly applicable in the age of cellular telephony and GIS data created on the fly. It is possible that certain networked advocacy efforts could make it easier for states to control populations that were previously illegible. If this occurs, it is unclear whether such efforts will leave a given population better off than they were previously.

Scott warns that the most tragic "state episodes" in recent history originates with a genuine desire to improve the human condition. These tragic state episodes begin with an authoritarian state implementing policies reflecting high modernist ideals amidst a weak civil society. While Scott is not categorically opposed to high modernism or legibility, he warns that a false perception of human knowledge and social engineering is a dangerous combination. As a result, the negative implications of legibility should be thoroughly considered when contemplating networked advocacy plans, even if they are well-intentioned. The anonymity of data is one area of concern that deserves special attention. If states seek to impose their scientific beliefs, and methods for making populations legible, what does that mean for ICTs whose very purpose is to lower the cost of collaboration and information? The prior literature discussed here has shown that digital technologies and platforms can be leveraged for collective and social benefits, can hold state's accountable, or can provide modalities of governance in areas where no state seemingly exists. ICTs have the ability to play a very different role when examined against a backdrop of James Scott and population legibility, one that aims for control and repression rather than liberation and collaboration. This raises the possibility for the state to use ICTs for purposes that are enslaving, quite the opposite of liberating. One of the problems with such state initiated standardization, even when done with the best of intentions, is that it robs a community of its very ability to resist to this state imposition and control, and even total authoritarian repression. Another problem arises from, in the case of a digital and abundant information environment, who controls the data? If the state also has a total monopoly over the information environment, then control and manipulation in this day and age become as easy as pressing a button, wiretapping a phone call, or locating political dissidents to within mere feet of their physical location represented on a GIS map. As Scott states, the technologies and capabilities now available to "enhance the legibility of a society to its rulers have become vastly more sophisticated, but the political motives driving them have changed little - appropriation, control, and manipulation remain the most prominent (77)."

If the overarching concern of the state's political, economic, or theologic regime is with self-preservation, then ICTs such as those discussed prior in the hands of a dictator or authoritarian ruler can be a powerful tool for quashing any sort of challenges. This does however, bring up an interesting point - if state's adopt and implement ICTs in order to make populations more legible and to control and manipulate them or any opponents, what kind of cycle does that create? Just for a moment let's imagine a hypothetical situation:

Activist A is either living under a repressive, authoritarian regime, state, or political institution. In order to circumvent the controls and monitoring of the state, Activist A takes to digitally enabled ICTs and other platforms such as Facebook, Twitter, etc. in order to communicate and collaborate with much lower costs, and possibly without fear of being outed by the state. Sensing, or experiencing collaboration and collective action on the part of a partial or full segment of the population, the state then leverages ICTs in order to track and monitor dissidents, to ensure a monopoly control over the data, and to generally secure self-preservation of the regime. Noting that those particular platforms or ICT's no longer are available as a means of bringing redress to the state, what does Activist A do in response? Does he look for more, and newer ICTs and platforms that are unbeknownst to the state? Or does he abandon all hope of using electronic networks and ICTs to look for assistance in the mold of Keck and Sikkink's ‘boomerang model?’ When ICTs can no longer be leveraged because they are controlled, monitored, and owned by the state, what is left in the activists’ arsenal? It would seem that he would revert then to either traditional repertoires of contention (Tarrow 2011), boomerang throwing (Keck & Sikkink 1998), or some combination of both. It would appear that both sides are caught in a vicious cycle, and until either the regime or state changes, collapses, or gives in, they are stuck. So in that way, when the state actually controls the ICTs, can governance truly be brought to areas of limited statehood, or effective in holding states accountable and transparent? Maybe leaving it up to James Scott to sum up is best: "The legibility of society provides the capacity for large-scale social engineering, high-modernist ideology provides the desire, the authoritarian state provides the determination to act on that desire, and an incapacitated civil society provides the leveled social terrain on which to build (5)."

One thing that seems pertinent in Scott's discussion of "High Modernism" as it relates to ICTs and advocacy efforts is the focus on scientific progress and the idea that measurement represents improvement, and that society should consistently pursue that highest version of progress. This seems to be the actual purpose of legibility and the role of ICTs in bringing legibility to areas of limited statehood. It is using the best that humanity has to offer, in terms of technological development, to organize people and provide services absent what were once considered the best structures to do so. Yes, Scott's work points to how progress can be co-opted by individuals and states with bad intentions, but that should not put limitations on how progress can be beneficial. The literature from Livingston and Walter-Drop provide testimony to how certain populations in the world are only exposed to public health services through ICTs, which is a direct result of our technical progress as a society.

The work done by theorists such as Risse and Lehmkuhl and Livingston and Walter-Drop paints a somewhat optimistic picture of the power of information and communication technologies in areas of limited statehood and the Global South, and the Amazon and Guatemala case studies further illustrate technology's ability to empower disenfranchised, isolated populations to improve their situations and gain crucial insights. On the other end of the spectrum is Scott's work, which suggests that advancements in science and technology have the potential to be detrimental to populations when authoritative states with unrelenting faith in science and technology impose designs based on this mentality on groups incapable of resisting these designs. Activists and advocacy researchers may need to further explore whether technological advancements are ever purely beneficial to populations or whether the potential for governments to impose these tools on populations and leverage technology to police, control, and oppress them outweighs any potential benefits. It seems that Scott has the most comprehensive, satisfying answer to this dilemma in the conclusion of his book. He cites several examples of states implementing technically masterful designs replete with standards and scientific support in their societies, only to fail due to a lack of consideration of the people living in those societies and their often useful mētis, or "situated, local knowledge." These observations do not denounce high modernism or science; rather, they serve as a reminder to states of the importance of avoiding imperialism in implementing knowledge-based designs. Scott's work, while seemingly pessimistic on its face, imparts important advice for activists working with technology and stresses the importance of diversity in planning and knowledge sharing and empowering each institution to "take much of its shape from the evolving mētis of its people [to] enhance their range of experience and skills."
