= Sidney Tarrow =

American political scientist (born 1938)

Sidney George Tarrow (born 1938) is an American emeritus professor of political science, known for his research in the areas of comparative politics, social movements, political parties, collective action and political sociology.

== Biography ==
B.A. Syracuse University, 1960, American studies; M.A. Columbia University, 1961, public law and government; Ph.D. University of California, Berkeley, 1965, political science.

He is currently Emeritus Maxwell Upson Professor of Government and adjunct professor of law at Cornell University.

== Thought ==
Tarrow's first area of interest was the study of communism in the 1960s. In the 1970s he moved to the study of comparative local politics and in the 1980s to the study of social movements and protest cycles (or 'cycles of contention'). A specialist in European politics and society, Sidney Tarrow has written widely on Italian and French politics, centre-periphery relations, new social movements, and contentious politics. Tarrow is a leading expert on new social movements and, more broadly, the phenomena of contentious behaviour.

His 1994 book Power in Movement analyses the cultural, organizational and personal sources of social movements' power, stressing that the life cycle of social movements is a part of political struggle influenced by the existence (or lack of) the political opportunity structures. He argues that social movements rise "when shifting political conditions open opportunities for disruption and the activities of social movements in turn can alter political policies and structures". Tarrow's five elements of political opportunity structures includes: 1) increasing access, 2) shifting alignments, 3) divided elites, 4) influential allies and 5) repression and facilitation. Tarrow writes that unlike political or economic social institutions, social movements' power is less obvious, but just as real. In the book, Tarrow tries to explain the cyclical history of social movements (visible in the form of the protest cycles). He also shows how movements can affect various spheres of life, such as personal lives, policy reforms and political culture. In that book he also lists four prerequisites of sustainable social movements: 1) political opportunities, 2) diffuse social networks, 3) familiar forms of collective action (also known as the Charles Tilly's repertoire of contention), and 4) cultural frames that can resonate throughout a population.

In 2001, Tarrow, with Doug McAdam and Charles Tilly, published Dynamics of Contention (Cambridge 2001), in which the authors broadened the social movement framework to cover a broader spectrum of forms of contention. This was followed by Tarrow's New Transnational Activism (Cambridge 2005), in which he applied the framework to the new transnational cycle of contention, and by a textbook with Tilly called Contentious Politics (Paradigm, 2006). He is currently working on international human rights.

He was formerly on the advisory board of FFIPP-USA (Faculty for Israeli-Palestinian Peace-USA), a network of Palestinian, Israeli, and International faculty, and students, working in for an end of the Israeli occupation of Palestinian territories and just peace.

== Selected publications ==
- Peasant Communism in Southern Italy, New Haven, Connecticut: Yale University Press, 1967; (revised and translated as Partito comunista e contadini nel Mezzogiorno, Turin: Giulio Einaudi, ed., 1972).
- Between Center and Periphery: Grassroots Politicians in Italy and France, Yale University Press, 1977; (translated as Tra centro e periferia, Il Mulino, 1979).
- Democracy and Disorder, Oxford University Press, 1989 (revised and translated as Democrazia e disordine, Laterza, 1990).
- Power in Movement: Collective Action, Social Movements and Politics, Cambridge University Press, 1994. (Spanish trans.: El Poder en Movimiento, Alianza, 1998; revised as Power in Movement: Social Movements and Contentious Politics, Cambridge University Press, 1998).
- The New Transnational Activism, Cambridge University Press, 2005.
- (with Bert Klandermans and Hanspeter Kriesi, eds.) From Structure to Action: Comparing Social Movement Research Across Cultures, International Social Movement Research I, (JAI Press, 1988).
- (with David S. Meyer) The Social Movement Society: Contentious Politics for a New Century. Rowman & Littlefield, 1998.
- (with Doug Imig) Contentious Europeans: Protest and Politics in a Europeanizing Polity. Rowman and Littlefield, 2001.
- (with Doug McAdam and Charles Tilly) Dynamics of Contention. Cambridge University Press, 2001.
- (with Ron Aminzade, et al.) Silence and Voice in the Study of Contentious Politics. Cambridge University Press, 2001.
- (with Donatella della Porta) Transnational Protest and Global Activism, Rowman and Littlefield, 2005.
- The New Transnational Activism, Cambridge University Press, 2005.
- Strangers at the Gates: Movements and States in Contentious Politics, Cambridge University Press, 2012.
- War, States, and Contention, Cornell University Press, 2015.
- (with David Meyers, et al.) The Restistance: The Dawn of the Anti-Trump Opposition Movement, Oxford University Press, 2018
- Movements and Parties: Critical Connections in American Political Development, Cambridge University Press, 2021.

== See also ==
- Contentious politics – Disruptive action oriented to change
- Social movement – Group sharing social or political objectives
- Charles Tilly – American sociologist (1929–2008)
