= Citizen Advocacy organisations =

Citizen Advocacy organisations (Citizen Advocacy programs/programmes) seek to cause benefit by reconnecting people who have become isolated from the ordinary community. Their practice was defined in two key documents: CAPE in 1980 and Learning From Citizen Advocacy Programs in 1987. The theoretical foundation of Citizen Advocacy is found in Citizen Advocacy and protective services for the impaired and handicapped. A central idea on which this practice is based is that the devaluation of a person or group by society has profoundly negative effects on their lives.

== Key ideas ==
At the heart of the work of a Citizen Advocacy organisation is the belief that how well an individual or group is valued by society (as a whole) affects how society treats them.

If an individual or group is seen as having value then society (as a whole) will treat them well. The result that they will have the full benefit of being part of that society.

If an individual or group is identified by society as 'different', and is seen as having less value (than everyone else) then society will treat them poorly. For instance they will be disempowered and excluded, made into scapegoats, segregated, and put with others seen to be like them.

This idea is seen as particularly powerful in the context of certain groups of people whom society identifies (incorrectly) as being somehow fundamentally negatively different from, and of lower value than, ordinary people (for instance 'the mentally ill' or 'people with special needs' or 'autistic people' or 'asylum seekers').

Citizen Advocacy organisations seek to cause benefit by connecting individual people who have been excluded and devalued with someone generally seen by society as being valued. There are some clear immediate effects on the person's exclusion and sense of self-worth. But also very important are the anticipated effects brought about when the ordinary community sees that a 'valued' person has an ordinary relationship with this person (e.g. a friendship), and that this 'valued' person sees them as an equal (i.e. also a 'valued' person). However, the anticipated effects are even wider than this, in that it is assumed that society (in general) will extend their conclusions to cover the group of people whom the individual has been seen to belong to.

=== Simplified illustrative example ===
A Citizen Advocacy organisation connects a person 'labelled' as having a 'learning disability' ('developmental disability') – his name is Helios - with a person of standing in their local community (for instance a well liked shopkeeper) – whose name is Alex. These two people develop a friendship. Helios and Alex are seen together, and other people get to know Helios. Alex and Helios behave as friends, and describe themselves as friends. While they sometimes seek support from the Citizen Advocacy organisation, they do not speak about being connected to it, other than to mention that it was this organisation that introduced them.
People in the community get to know Helios through Alex, which is of immediate benefit to Helios. When Alex finds out that Helios is living in poor housing conditions, he and several other people help to work with Helios to find private rented accommodation and to secure the support he needs to live there.
Several people write to the local authorities and politicians to complain about how people with learning disabilities are being treated. Because the politicians see that it is ordinary members of the public who are interested in this issue, they ensure that the situation improves.

Stories of actual Citizen Advocacy relationships have been written about in many contexts. One set of such stories is found in One person at a time: Citizen Advocacy for people with disabilities.
