= Protest cycle =

Sociological theory about the evolution of protests

Protest cycles (also known as cycles of contention or waves of collective action) refers to the cyclical rise and fall in the social movement activity. Sidney Tarrow (1998) defines them as "a phase of heightened conflict across the social system", with "intensified interactions between challengers and authorities which can end in reform, repression and sometimes revolution".

Tarrow argues that cyclical openings in political opportunity create incentives for collective action. Those cycles begin when the authority (like the government) becomes seen as vulnerable to social change, in a time when demands for social change are increasing. He defines the political opportunity as "consistent dimension of the political environment that provides incentives for people to undertake collective action by affecting their expectations of success or failure". When the political opportunity disappears, for example because of a change in the public opinion caused by a rise in insecurity and violence, the movement dissolves.

Tarrow lists the qualities of a cycle of contention:

- a rapid diffusion of collective action and mobilization as existing social movements create political opportunities for others to act or join in;
- innovation in the forms of contention;
- the creation or major change in collective action frames, discourses and frames of meaning;
- coexistence of organized and unorganized activists;
- increased interaction between challengers and authorities.

Tarrow (1998) notes that "such widespread contention produces externalities that give challengers at least a temporary advantage and allows them to overcome the weaknesses in their resource base. It demands that states devise broad strategies of response that are either repressive or facilitative, or a combination of the two."

He writes that even defeated or suppressed movements leave some kind of residue behind them, and that effect of social movements, successful or failed, is cumulative in the long term, leading to new protest cycles. This is visible especially when those cycles are analysed in the historical frame. Prior to the 18th century, rebellions were usually aimed at local targets in response to local grievances, usually without many preparations and without allies in different social or ethnic groups. This has however changed in the 18th century, when social movements evolved in West Europe and North America (see also works by Charles Tilly).

== See also ==
- Framing (social sciences)
