= Deep lobbying =

Deep lobbying is a process of shaping the intellectual atmosphere around a politicized topic based on a political or economic agenda. Most deep lobbying is done by think tanks, who create talking points and sponsor fellowships for like-minded academics (so-called "wingnut welfare").

The concept was coined by American journalist and author William Greider in his book Who Will Tell the People? The Betrayal of American Democracy (1992):

The larger point is that an informal alliance was being formed by two important players...to massage a subject several years before it would become a visible political debate. There was nothing illegitimate about this...But the process that defines the scope of the public problem is often where the terms of the solution are predetermined. That is the purpose of deep lobbying—to draw boundaries around the public debate.

The idea was further expanded in 2003 by journalist and blogger Steven Clemons in a paper for the Japan Policy Research Institute Says Clemons, "Think tanks are in the business of policy analysis, but they also market that analysis and attempt to sell their views to the public and to the government. For example, senior fellows at Brookings maintain a reputation for being more academic than most policy wonks in Washington and broadcast their work through books more frequently than other researchers. By contrast, fellows at the Heritage Foundation operate more frequently through faxed policy briefs or op-eds in The Washington Times and other newspapers and magazines. In the last decade, the same phenomenon that has occurred in scientific research and development funding has happened in the public policy analysis business."
