= Margaret Keck =

American political scientist

- Born: Margaret Elizabeth Keck; January 12, 1949 (age 77)
- Education: Columbia University
- Awards: Grawemeyer Award; Lynton Keith Caldwell Prize, APSA; Elinor Ostrom Career Achievement Award
- Scientific career
- Fields: Political science; Latin American studies
- Workplaces: Johns Hopkins University

Margaret Keck (born January 12, 1949) is an American political scientist and Brazilianist, currently an Academy Professor and professor emeritus of political science at Johns Hopkins University. Keck studies the Politics of Brazil, environmental politics, international activist movements and networked advocacy.

== Career ==
Keck graduated from Columbia University with a PhD in 1986. She began doing research in Brazil in 1982.

Keck has written four books. Her first book, The Workers' Party and Democratization in Brazil, was published in 1992. Ben Ross Schneider wrote that this "definitive study" was one of the first "solid analyses in English of the Workers' party". In 1998, she and Kathryn Sikkink published Activists Beyond Borders: Advocacy in International Politics, which studied the role of advocacy networks that transcend national politics and have effects in multiple countries. The book won the Grawemeyer Award for Ideas Improving World Order in 1999, making Keck and Sikkink the first women ever to win that award.

Her 2007 book, Greening Brazil: Environmental Activism in State and Society, was co-authored with Kathryn Hochstetler. The book reviews the evolution of environmental politics and activism in Brazil. In a review in Foreign Affairs, Richard Feinberg wrote that the book demonstrates how networks of activists affect policy formation. The book received the 2009 Lynton Keith Caldwell Prize for the best book on environmental politics and policy from the Science, Technology & Environmental Politics section of the American Political Science Association. Her most recent book, Practical Authority: Agency and Institutional Change in Brazilian Water Politics, was co-authored with Rebecca Neaera Abers and published in 2013.

Keck retired from Johns Hopkins University in 2016. That year, she received the Elinor Ostrom STEP Career Achievement Award from the American Political Science Association. In 2019, a citation analysis by the political scientists Hannah June Kim and Bernard Grofman listed Keck as the 15th most cited active emeritus political scientist at an American university.

Keck's work has been featured in Foreign Affairs and the North American Congress on Latin America, and cited in outlets like The Washington Post, The Chronicle of Higher Education, and GreenBiz.

== Selected works ==
- The Workers' Party and Democratization in Brazil (1992)
- Activists Beyond Borders: Advocacy in International Politics. With Kathryn Sikkink (1998)
- "Water, Water Everywhere, Nor Any Drop to Drink: Land Use and Water Policy in São Paulo," in Livable Cities, Peter Evans ed. (2000)

== Selected awards ==
- Grawemeyer Award for Ideas Improving World Order, with Kathryn Sikkink, 1999
- Lynton Keith Caldwell Prize, American Political Science Association, 2009
- Elinor Ostrom Career Achievement Award, American Political Science Association
