= Quaxing =

Transport neologism

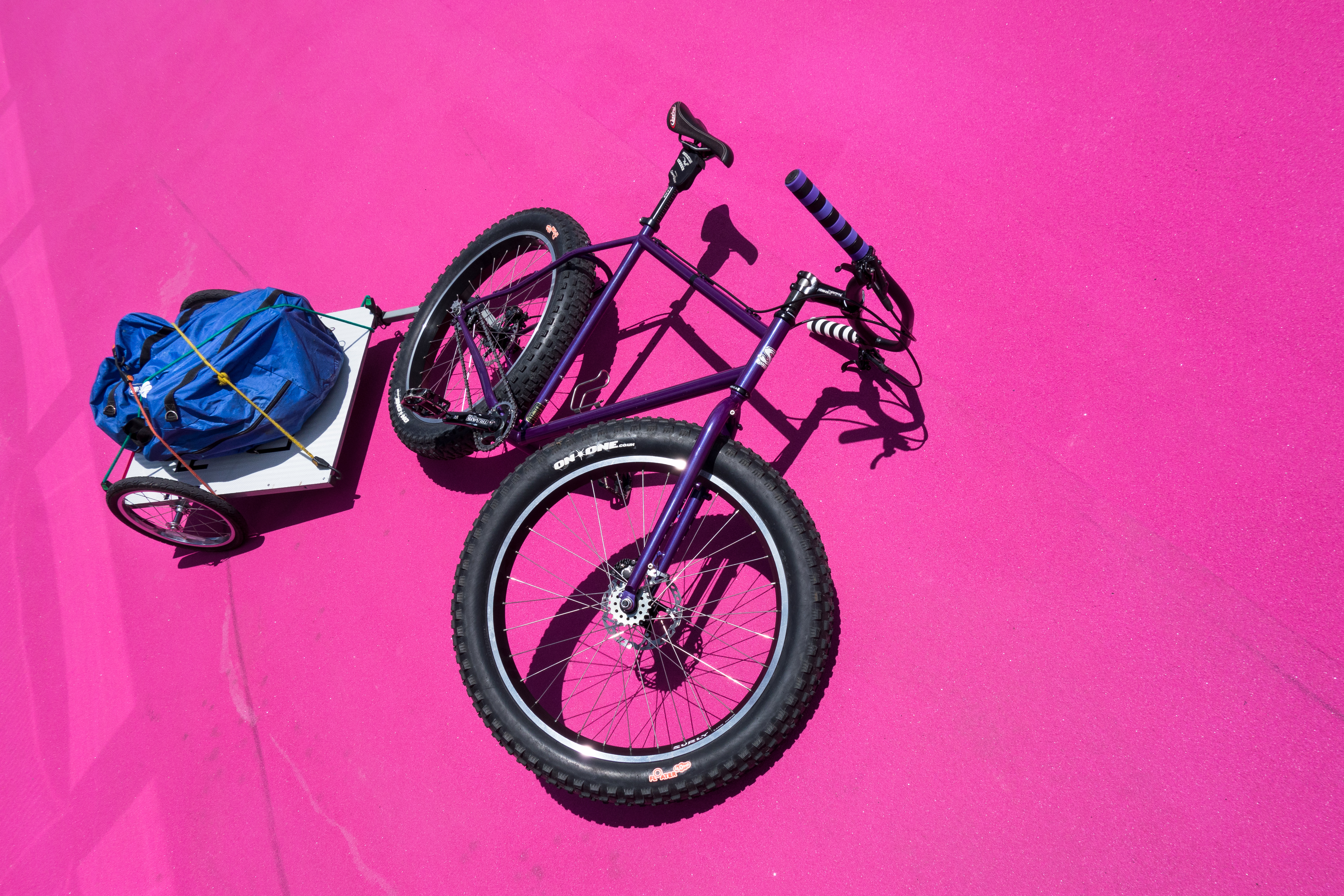
Photo published with the title "Nelson Street Quaxing", taken on that part of the Nelson Street Cycleway in Auckland that has a pink surface

Quaxing is a 2015 neologism meaning "to shop, in the western world, by means of walking, cycling or public transit". It is also a form of transport activism to combat transport divide, and bringing visibility to the possibility of a car-free life.

== Origin of the term ==
In January 2015, a local councillor in Auckland, New Zealand, Dick Quax tweeted, “No one in the entire Western world uses the train for their shopping trips…the very idea that people lug home their supermarket shopping on the train is fanciful.”

People responded with pictures of themselves doing their shopping by non-car means using the term #quaxing.

The term was defined on blogs and tweets as "Quax, [verb; past: quaxed, present: quaxing] — to shop, in the western world, by means of walking, cycling or public transit."

== Growth of the trend ==
The trend gathered steam as an internet meme. Soon media outlets picked up on the trend and covered the story and its implications for politicians and planners.

Although it refers to shopping by any non-car means, it has been most widely adopted by cyclists.

Public Address chose quaxing as their Word of the Year in 2015, which gained further media coverage for the trend.

Momentum Mag described quaxing as:

"A rallying call to politicians to take the needs of cyclists, pedestrians, and transit users seriously."

The term continues to be used by bike advocates to normalise everyday activities by bike.

== See also ==
- Alternatives to car use
- Car-free movement
- Societal effects of cars
